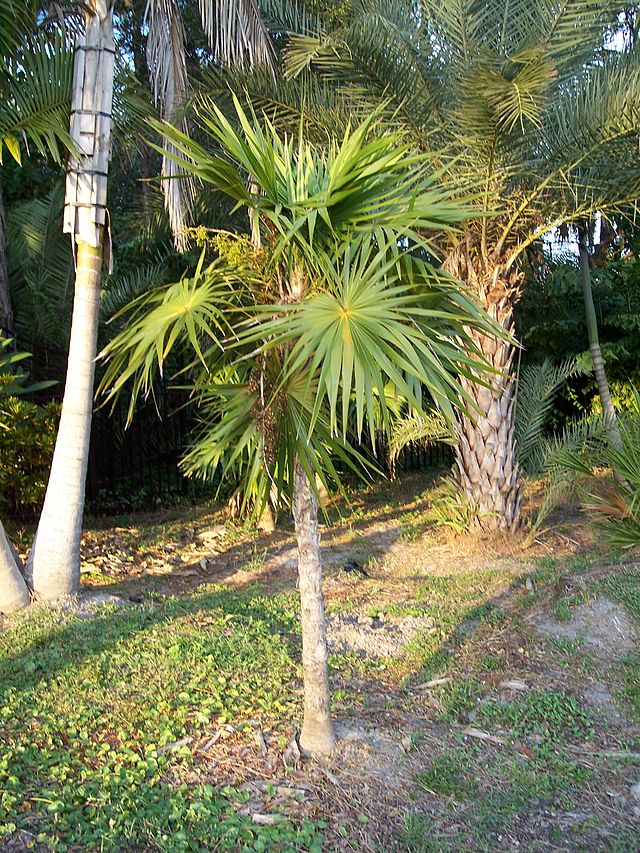

Conservation status
- Least Concern (IUCN 3.1)

- Apparently Secure (NatureServe)

Scientific classification
- Kingdom: Plantae
- Clade: Tracheophytes
- Clade: Angiosperms
- Clade: Monocots
- Clade: Commelinids
- Order: Arecales
- Family: Arecaceae
- Genus: Thrinax
- Species: T. radiata

Binomial name
- Thrinax radiata Lodd. ex Schult. & Schult.f.

Synonyms
- Coccothrinax radiata Thrinax floridiana Thrinax martii Thrinax wendlandiana

= Thrinax radiata =

Species of palm

Thrinax radiata, also known as the Florida thatch palm, is a medium to slow growing palm in the family Arecaceae. It is native to many Caribbean islands, Mexico, Central America, and far southern Florida. Its natural habitat is sandy, calcareous soil in coastal areas.

== Description ==
Like all palms, this species grows thick and low to the ground before sending its meristem vertical, gaining the form of a slender tree. This species has no crownshaft and the canopy appears to emerge directly from the trunk. On average this species reaches a height of 20 feet. It has large compoundly segmented leaves which are 4 to 5 feet wide and 2.5 feet long. The leaves are palmate and divide into segments about halfway down their length with the leaf emerging from the petiole in what is described as a pointed hastula shape. The entire canopy consists of between 10 and 20 large leaves and on average gains only 6 inches of height per year. The shape of the canopy varies depending on its amount of insolation, with full sun specimens appearing more globular or compact, and shaded specimens having a longer, more spread-out canopy. This species can flower when the tree is only 6 feet tall. The inflorescences exceed 3 feet in length, arch downwards, and can extend below the frond. The flowers are white, bisexual, and occur year-round, with peak production in the spring. The resulting fruits, called drupes, are white and can also be seen year round.

It can be distinguished from the similar-looking genus Coccothrinax by its white drupes, whereas the drupes in Coccothrinax are black or yellow. Another distinguishing characteristic of Thrinax are its split leaf bases, while the leaf bases of Coccothrinax are fused.

== Common names ==
Common names include Florida thatch palm, Jamaican thatch, Jamaica thatch palm, chit, silk-top thatch palm, sea thatch palm, and Caribbean thatch palm.

== Ecology ==
Thrinax radiata is found primarily in coastal scrub areas from the Caribbean to Mexico, and can even grow in exposed limestone. It is also occasionally found in pinelands in South Florida and semi-evergreen forests in the Yucatán Peninsula. Its seeds are eaten and presumably dispersed by many animals including bats, spider monkeys, toucans, armadillos, and deer. Young leaves are also eaten by spider monkeys, and mature ones serve as a refuge for several bat species. In Florida (Elliott Key in particular), the invasive Mexican gray squirrel (Sciurus aureogaster) has had an extremely negative impact on T. radiata populations. It uses palm fibers as nesting materials and consumes the palm itself, often killing the plant.

== Distribution ==
In the wild, this species almost always grows close to coastal areas where it is adapted to tolerating heavy winds, high concentrations of salt, and even drought. It naturally grows in sandy and calcareous soils where it does best in high pH soil. This species is native to regions of southern Florida, the Florida Keys and Puerto Rico in the United States, western Cuba, the Bahamas, the Cayman Islands, Jamaica, Hispaniola (the Dominican Republic and Haiti), the eastern coast of the Yucatán Peninsula of Mexico, Belize, Honduras, and Nicaragua.

== Taxonomy ==
It was once thought to belong to the related genus Coccothrinax.

- Cryosophileae
  - Trithrinax
  - - - Itaya
      - Sabinaria
    - - Chelyocarpus
      - - Cryosophila
        - - - Schippia
            - - Thrinax
              - - Leucothrinax
                - Hemithrinax
          - - Zombia
            - Coccothrinax

Simplified phylogeny of the Cryosophileae based on four nuclear genes and the matK plastid gene.

== Conservation ==
This species appears to be secure globally; however, it is rare at the northern edge of its range in Florida. While it is commonly cultivated as a landscape plant in residential areas, its status is the wild in Florida is poor and it is only rarely encountered. There are currently no specific efforts being undertaken to reduce the severity of this status in the United States. There are, however, restrictions on harvesting in Mexico, where human use has had a greater impact on T. radiata populations.

== Uses ==
This species is commonly used as a landscaping tree along roadways and in residential areas in South Florida (zone 10b and 11a). Today, it is being widely planted outside of its natural historic range in South Florida and the Caribbean because of its ability to grow under various conditions. It is used by gardeners and can be grown in containers or in arboretums, which showcase this species' prolific inflorescences and fruit. Its common name derives from the use of its fronds in thatched roofing. Its fronds are the most used part of the palm, being utilized in broom construction, handicrafts, and food wrapping. T. radiata's white fruit are edible. Its trunks have recently been used to construct lobster traps by fishermen in the Yucatán Peninsula.

== Gallery ==
Native Example - Big Pine Key, FL

Underside of leaf

Top of leaf

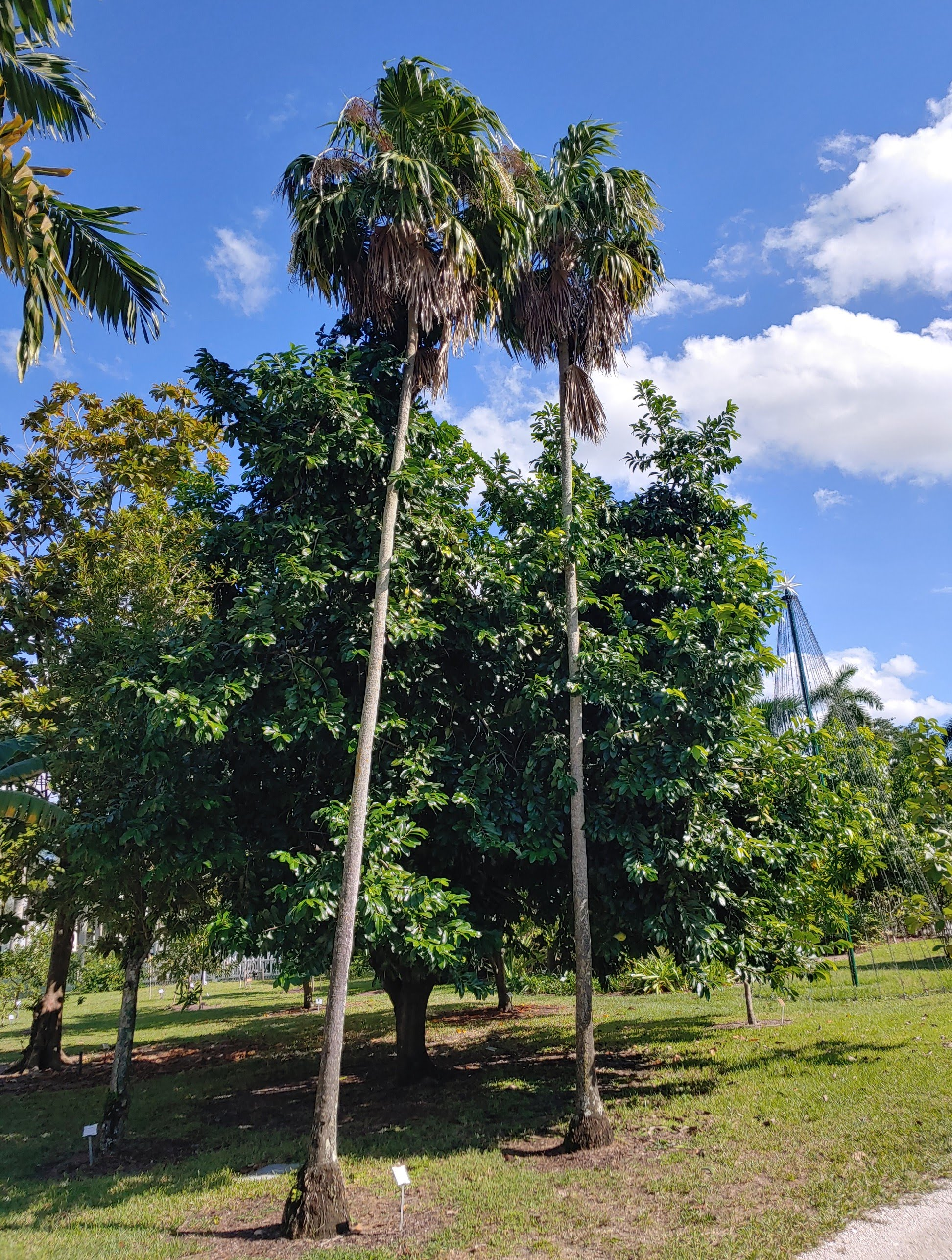
Old pair of ''Thrinax radiata'' growing in Fort Myers, FL

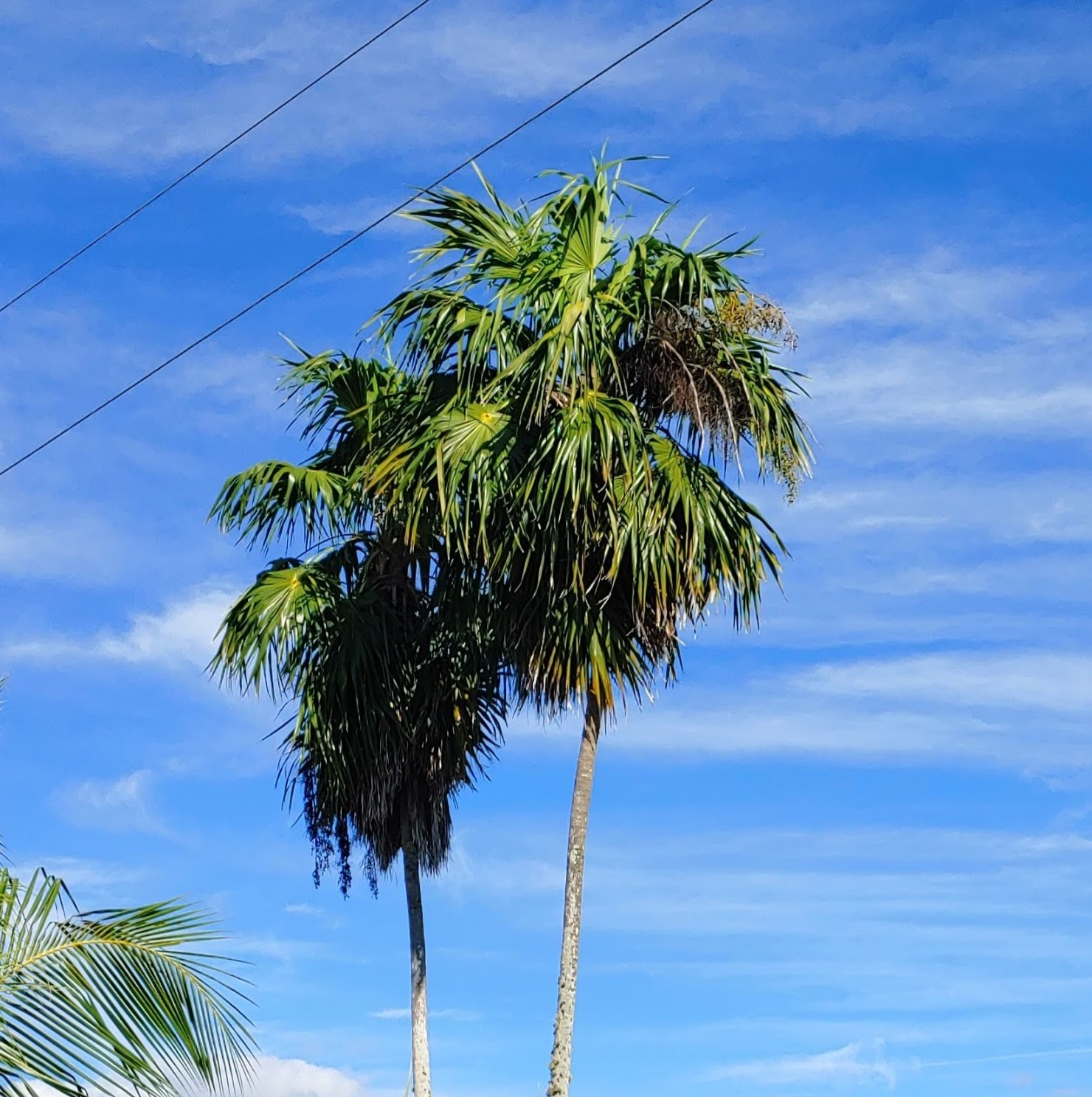
''Thrinax radiata'' seedling in Everglades City, FL

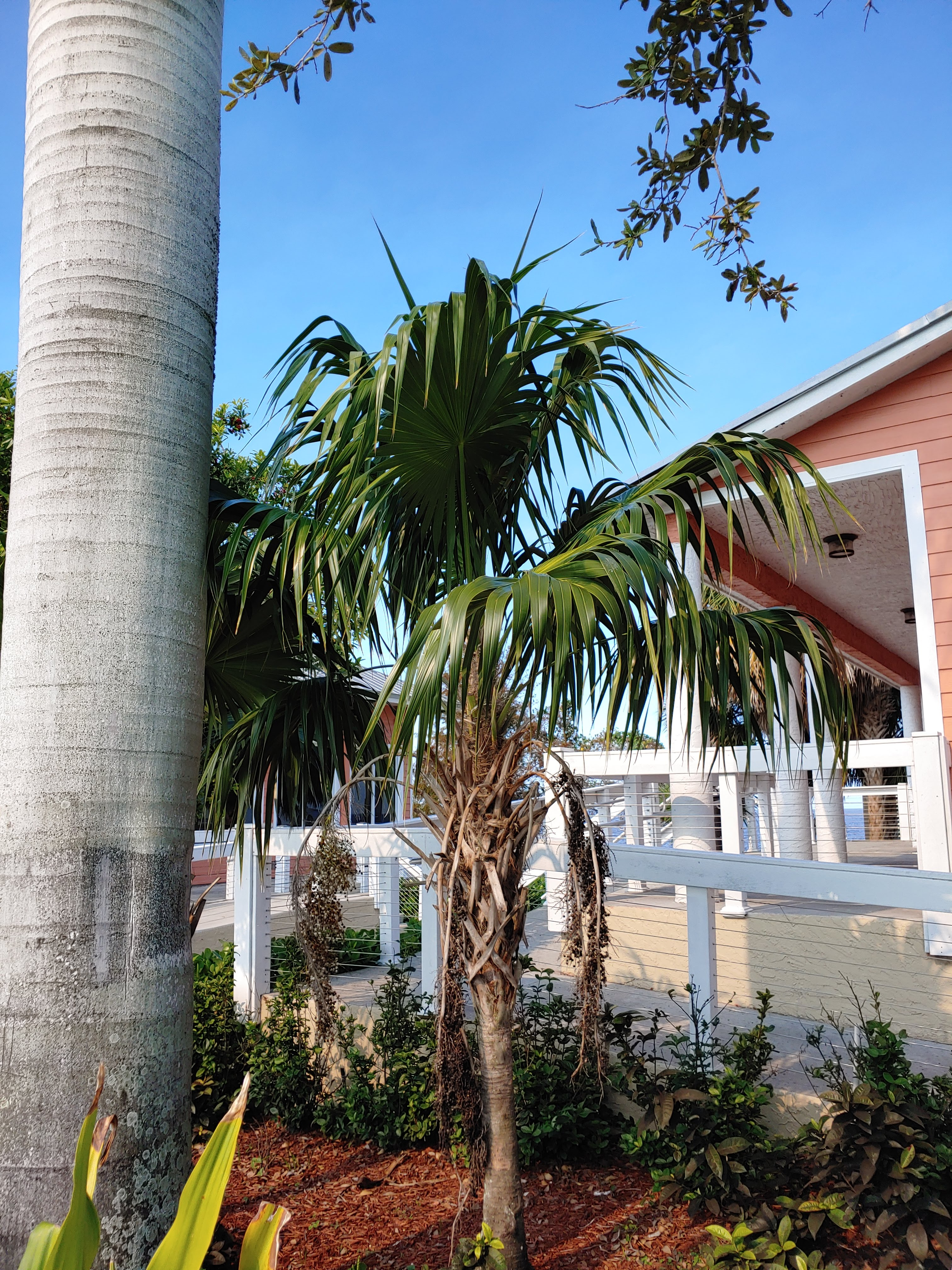
Young ''Thrinax radiata'' with seeds.
