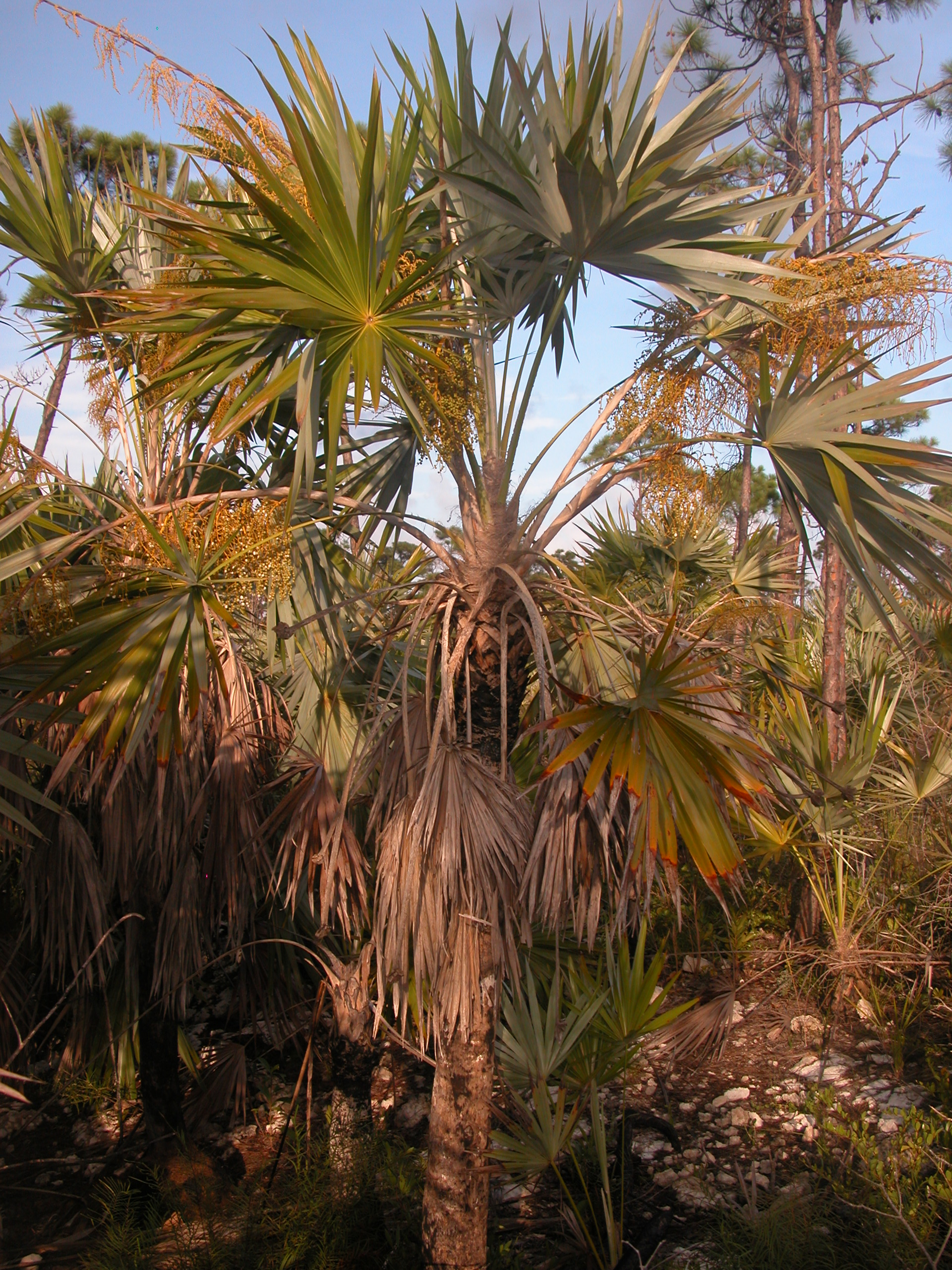
- Leucothrinax morrisii in the Florida Keys. Photo by Carl E. Lewis.

Conservation status
- Least Concern (IUCN 3.1)

- Apparently Secure (NatureServe)

Scientific classification
- Kingdom: Plantae
- Clade: Tracheophytes
- Clade: Angiosperms
- Clade: Monocots
- Clade: Commelinids
- Order: Arecales
- Family: Arecaceae
- Subfamily: Coryphoideae
- Tribe: Cryosophileae
- Genus: Leucothrinax; C.Lewis & Zona
- Species: L. morrisii

Binomial name
- Leucothrinax morrisii (H.Wendl.) C.Lewis & Zona

Synonyms
- Thrinax morrisii H.Wendl. Thrinax havanensis nom. nud. Thrinax microcarpa Sarg. Thrinax keyensis Sarg. Thrinax ponceana O.F.Cook; Thrinax praeceps O.F.Cook; Thrinax bahamensis O.F.Cook; Thrinax drudei Becc. Thrinax punctulata Becc. Thrinax ekmanii Burret; Simpsonia microcarpa (Sarg.) O.F.Cook

= Leucothrinax =

Key thatch palm

Genus of palms

Leucothrinax morrisii, the Key thatch palm, is a small palm which is native to the Greater Antilles (except Jamaica), northern Lesser Antilles, The Bahamas and Florida and the Florida Keys in the United States.

Until 2008 it was known as Thrinax morrisii. It was split from the genus Thrinax after phylogenetic studies showed that its inclusion in Thrinax would render that genus paraphyletic. The generic name combines leuco (in reference to the whitish colour of its flowering stalks and the undersides of its leaves) with thrinax.

== Common names ==
Leucothrinax morrisii is known as the "Key thatch palm" or the "brittle thatch palm" in the United States. In Anguilla it is called the "broom palm" or "buffalo-top", in The Bahamas, miraguano in Cuba and palma de escoba in Puerto Rico. Other common names include "small-fruited thatch palm", yaray, pandereta, palma de petate, palma de cogollo, guano de sierra, and palmita.

== Description ==
Leucothrinax morrisii is a palmate-leaved palm with solitary brown or grey stems 1–11 metres (3–36 ft) tall and 5–35 centimetres (2–14 in) in diameter. Leaves are pale blue-green or yellow-green, whitish on the undersides. Petioles are 27–84 cm (0.9–2.8 ft) long with split petioles. The leaflets are 33–75 cm (1.1–2.5 ft) long and 2.3–4.8 cm (1–2 in) wide. The inflorescences extend beyond the leaves and are 55–100 cm (1.8–3.3 ft) long. The fruit are white, and turn yellow as they mature.

== Distribution ==
Leucothrinax morrisii is native to the Florida mainland and Keys, the Bahamas, Cuba, Hispaniola (in the Dominican Republic and Haiti), Puerto Rico, Navassa Island, Saint Barthélemy, both the U.S. and British Virgin Islands, Anguilla and Saint Kitts and Nevis.

It is found in dry, deciduous forests and scrub and coastal areas. In the Florida Keys it grows at the edge of hardwood hammocks and in pinelands, while in Puerto Rico, it is found on cliffs and on limestone and ultramafic ridges. It can tolerate drought, and frequent salt spray.

== Taxonomy ==
- Cryosophileae
  - Trithrinax
  - - - Itaya
      - Sabinaria
    - - Chelyocarpus
      - - Cryosophila
        - - - Schippia
            - - Thrinax
              - - Leucothrinax
                - Hemithrinax
          - - Zombia
            - Coccothrinax

Simplified phylogeny of the Cryosophileae based on four nuclear genes and the matK plastid gene.

Leucothrinax is a monotypic genus—it includes only one species, L. morrisii. The species was originally described by German botanist Hermann Wendland, who placed it in the genus Thrinax.

In the first edition of Genera Palmarum (1987), Natalie Uhl and John Dransfield placed the genus Thrinax in the subfamily Coryphoideae, the tribe Corypheae and the subtribe Thrinacinae using Harold E. Moore's 1973 classification of the palm family. Subsequent phylogenetic analysis showed that the Old World and New World members of the Thrinacinae were not closely related. As a consequence of this, Thrinax and related genera were placed in their own tribe, Cryosophileae. A study of the phylogenetic relationships among Caribbean palms showed that the species then known as Thrinax morrisii was most closely related to Coccothrinax, Hemithrinax and Zombia, with the remainder of the genus Thinax being a sister group to this clade. Since the continued inclusion of this genus would render Thrinax paraphyletic, it was split off into a new genus, Leucothrinax.

== Uses ==
Stems of the plant are used for poles and the leaves are used for thatch and weaving.
