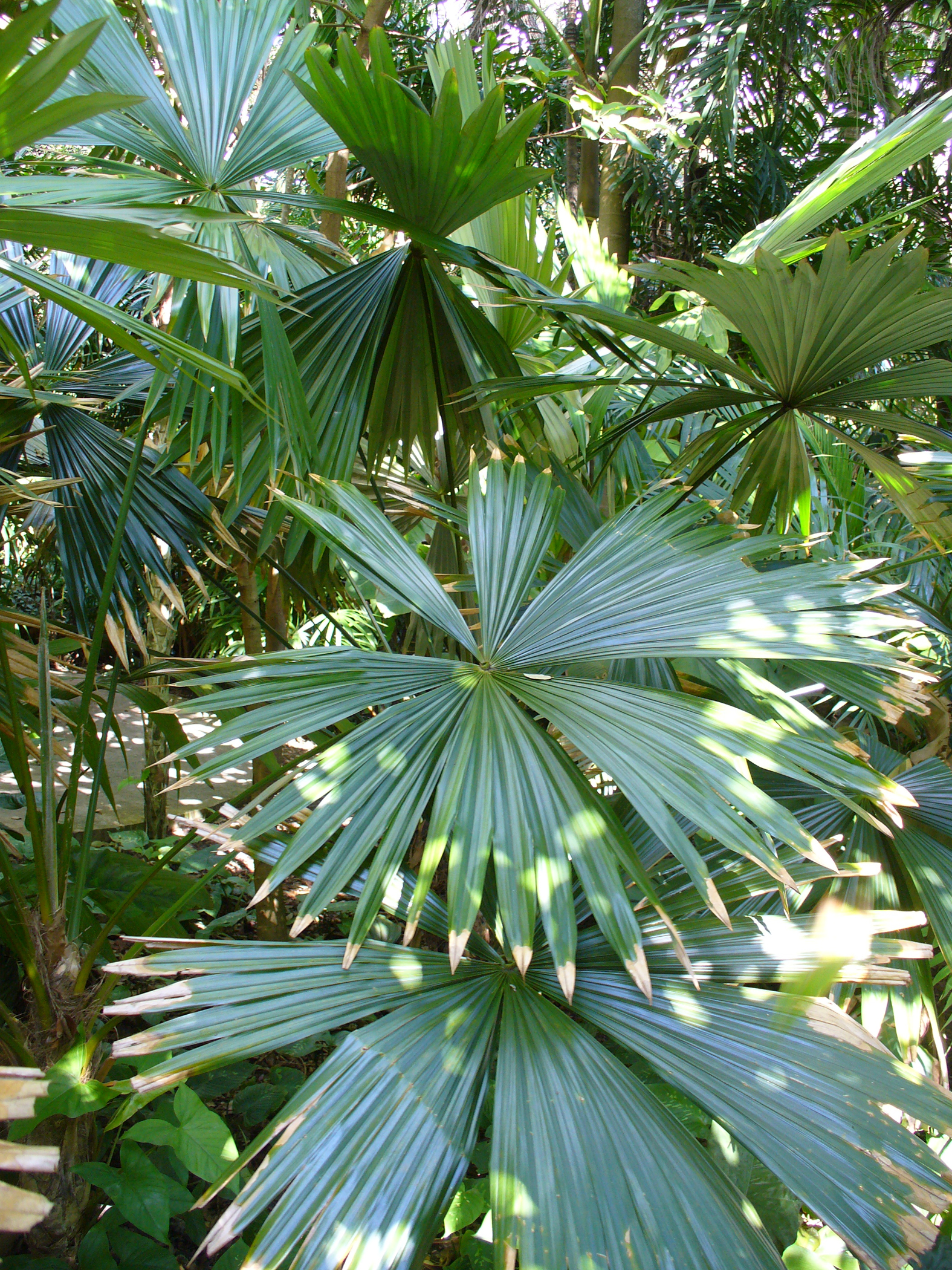
- Chelyocarpus ulei

Scientific classification
- Kingdom: Plantae
- Clade: Tracheophytes
- Clade: Angiosperms
- Clade: Monocots
- Clade: Commelinids
- Order: Arecales
- Family: Arecaceae
- Subfamily: Coryphoideae
- Tribe: Cryosophileae
- Genus: Chelyocarpus; Dammer

Type species
- Chelyocarpus ulei Dammer

Species
- Chelyocarpus chuco (Mart.) H.E.Moore; Chelyocarpus dianeurus (Burret) H.E.Moore; Chelyocarpus repens F.Kahn & K.Mejia; Chelyocarpus ulei Dammer

Synonyms
- Tessmanniophoenix Burret; Tessmanniodoxa Burret

= Chelyocarpus =

Genus of palms

Chelyocarpus is a genus of small to medium-sized fan palms which are native to northwestern South America. Some are upright trees, while others creep along the ground. Species are used for thatch, to weave hats, stuff pillows and as a source of salt.

== Description ==
Chelyocarpus is a type of small to medium-sized, single or multi-stemmed palms with fan shaped leaves. Stems range from short and creeping along the ground to as much as 15 metres (49 feet) tall. Stem diameters range from 4 to 12 centimetres (1.6 to 4.7 inches). Individuals have between 10 and 20 leaves with circular blades, the lower surface of which is usually whitish in colour. The flowers are small and bisexual—they have both male and female sex organs in the same flower. The fruit have one or two seeds and ripen to a greenish yellow or brown.

== Taxonomy ==
- Cryosophileae
  - Trithrinax
  - - - Itaya
      - Sabinaria
    - - Chelyocarpus
      - - Cryosophila
        - - - Schippia
            - - Thrinax
              - - Leucothrinax
                - Hemithrinax
          - - Zombia
            - Coccothrinax

Simplified phylogeny of the Cryosophileae based on four nuclear genes and the matK plastid gene.

The name Chelyocarpus is derived from Ancient Greek and means "turtle carapace-fruited", a reference to cracked surface of the fruits of the genus, which resemble the shell of a turtle. The species was first described by German botanist Carl Dammer in 1920. In the first edition of Genera Palmarum (1987), Natalie Uhl and John Dransfield placed the genus Chelyocarpus in subfamily Coryphoideae, tribe Corypheae and subtribe Thrinacinae Subsequent phylogenetic analysis showed that the Old World and New World members of Thrinacinae are not closely related. As a consequence, Chelyocarpus and related genera have been placed in their own tribe, Cryosophileae. Chelyocarpus is considered to form the sister clade to the rest of the tribe.

== Distribution ==
Three species of Chelyocarpus are native to the western Amazon, while the fourth is from western Colombia. Chelyocarpus chuco is found in Brazil and Bolivia, C. ulei in Colombia, Ecuador, Peru and Brazil, C. repens near Iquitos, Peru, and C. dianeurus is found in the Pacific lowlands of Colombia.

== Uses ==
The leaves of Chelyocarpus chuco are used for thatch and to weave hats. The woolly covering of the leaf sheaths of C. dianeurus are used to stuff pillows, and salt is extracted from the trunks of C. ulei.
