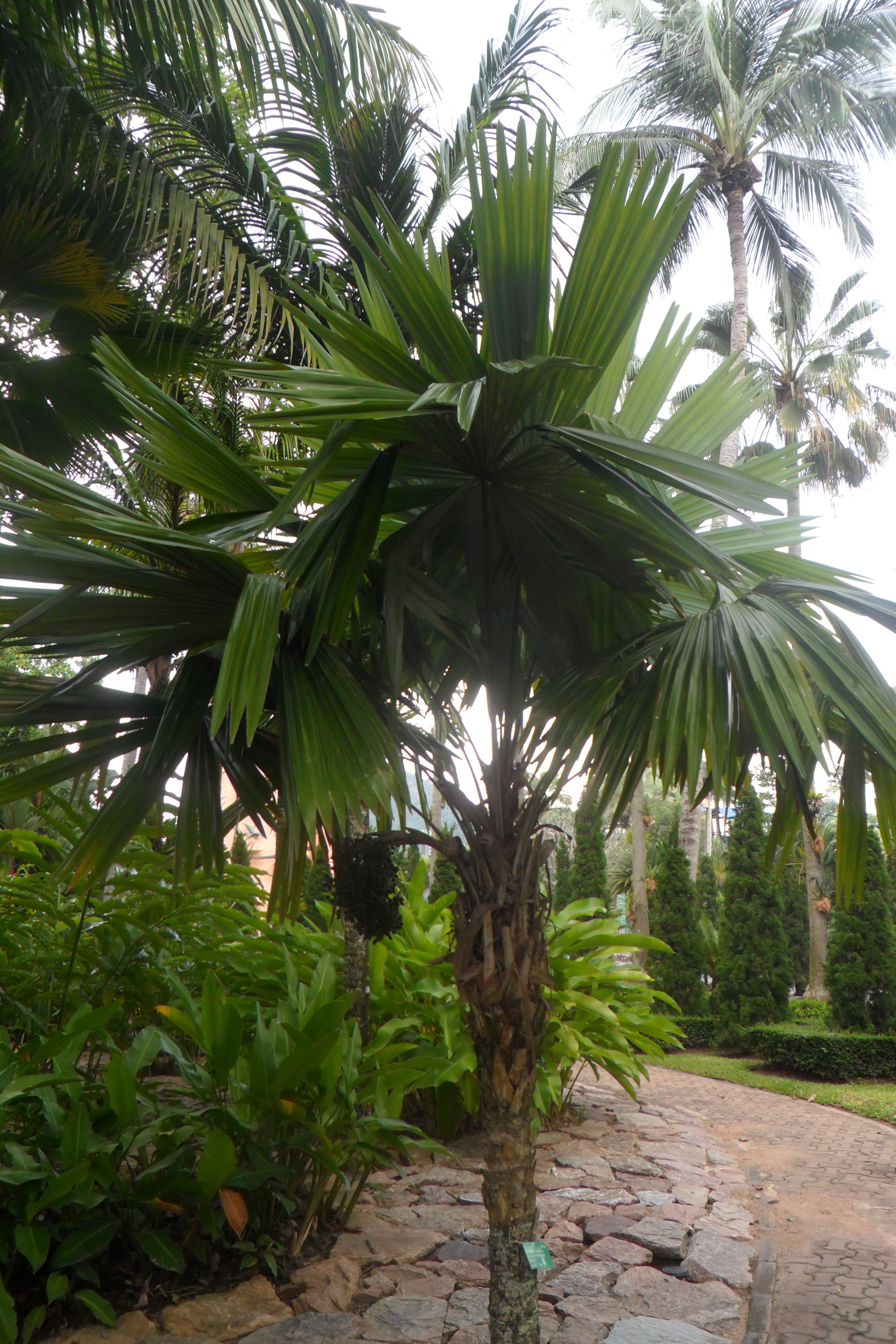

Conservation status
- Least Concern (IUCN 3.1)

Scientific classification
- Kingdom: Plantae
- Clade: Tracheophytes
- Clade: Angiosperms
- Clade: Monocots
- Clade: Commelinids
- Order: Arecales
- Family: Arecaceae
- Subfamily: Coryphoideae
- Tribe: Cryosophileae
- Genus: Itaya; H.E.Moore
- Species: I. amicorum

Binomial name
- Itaya amicorum H.E.Moore

= Itaya =

Species of plant

Itaya is a montypic genus of fan palm in the family Arecaceae. Itaya amicorum is the sole species in the genus. This medium-size palm is native to northern Brazil, Colombia, Ecuador, and Peru. It was unknown to science until 1972, when it was discovered on the bank of the Itaya River in the Peruvian Amazon.

== Description ==
Itaya amicorum is a medium-sized, single-stemmed palm with fan-shaped (or palmate) leaves. The stems reach a height of up to 4 metres (13 ft) with a diameter of 9 to 10 centimetres (3.5 to 3.9 in). Plants have between 11 and 25 leaves which have a roughly circular blade, about 2 m (6.6 ft) in diameter which is split into 10 to 16 broad leaflets, and a long petiole. The leaves have a whitish or silver-grey underside.

Itaya amicorum is pleonanthic - it flowers repeatedly over the course of its lifespan—and hermaphroditic; both male and female sex organs are present in the same flowers. The flowers are whitish in colour, while the fruit are yellowish-green, 2 to 2.5 cm (0.8 to 1.0 in) long, 1.5 to 2 cm (0.6 to 0.8 in) in diameter.

== Taxonomy ==
- NWTP
  - Sabaleae
    Sabal
  - Cryosophileae
    - Trithrinax
    - - - Itaya
        - Sabinaria
      - - Chelyocarpus
        - - Cryosophila
          - - - Schippia
              - - Thrinax
                - - Leucothrinax
                  - Hemithrinax
            - - Zombia
              - Coccothrinax

Simplified phylogeny of the New World thatch palms based on four nuclear genes and the matK plastid gene.

Itaya is a monotypic genus—it includes only a single species, I. amicorum. The species was first collected in 1972 along the Rio Itaya in Peru, and was described by Harold E. Moore the same year. In the first edition of Genera Palmarum (1987), Natalie Uhl and John Dransfield placed the genus Itaya in the subfamily Coryphoideae, the tribe Corypheae and the subtribe Thrinacinae Subsequent phylogenetic analysis showed that the Old World and New World members of the Thrinacinae were not closely related. As a consequence of this, Itaya and related genera were places in their own tribe, Cryosophileae.

== Distribution ==
Itaya amicorum is found only in the western Amazon basin in Brazil, Colombia and Peru. Originally thought to be endangered due to its narrow distribution, the species is now known to be more widely distributed. The IUCN Red List categorises the species as least concern.

== Uses ==
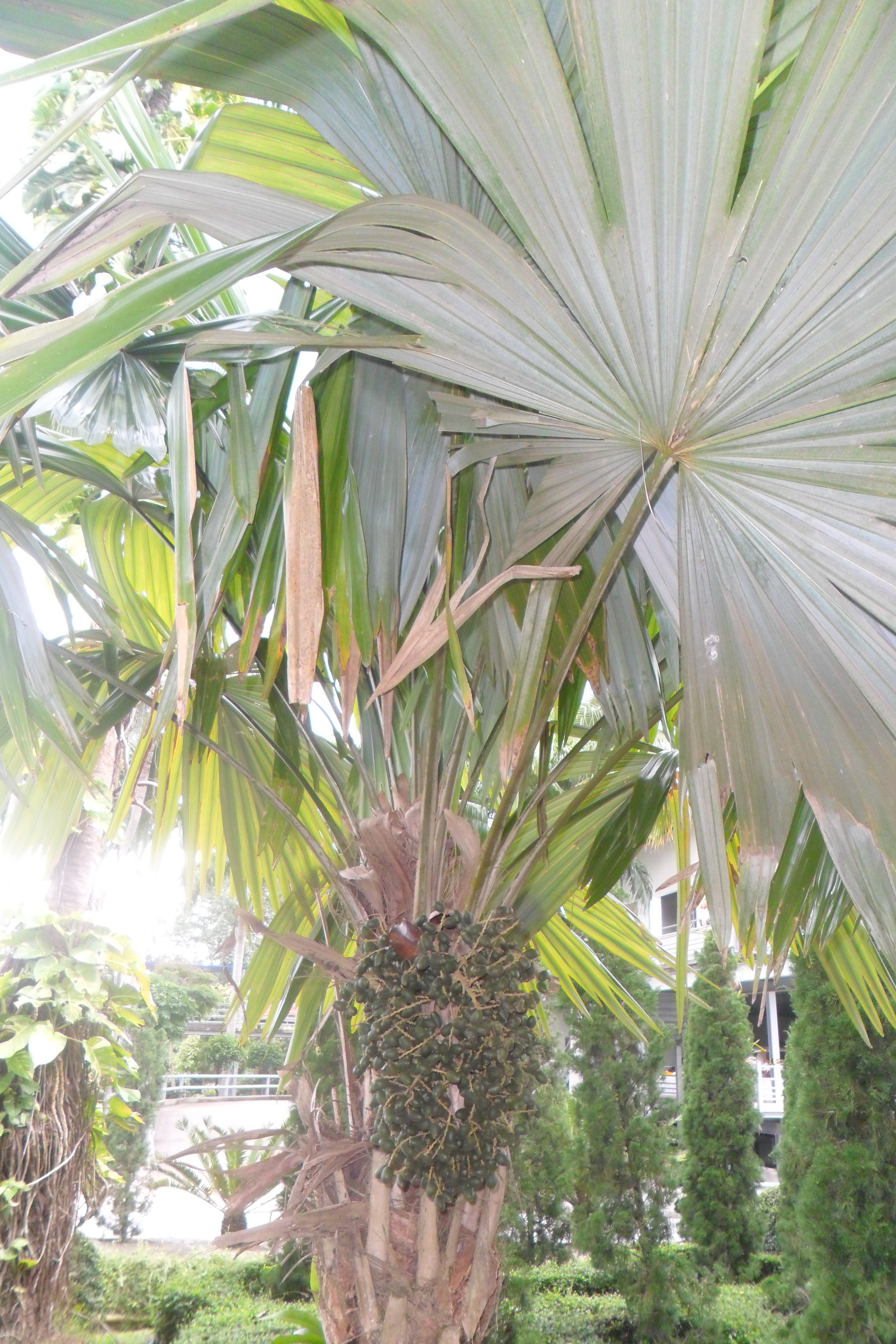
Fruit of Itaya amicorum

The Miraña, an indigenous Amerindian group in the Amazon, reportedly burn the trunks of Itaya amicorum in order to extract salt from them. The leaves are used for thatch.
