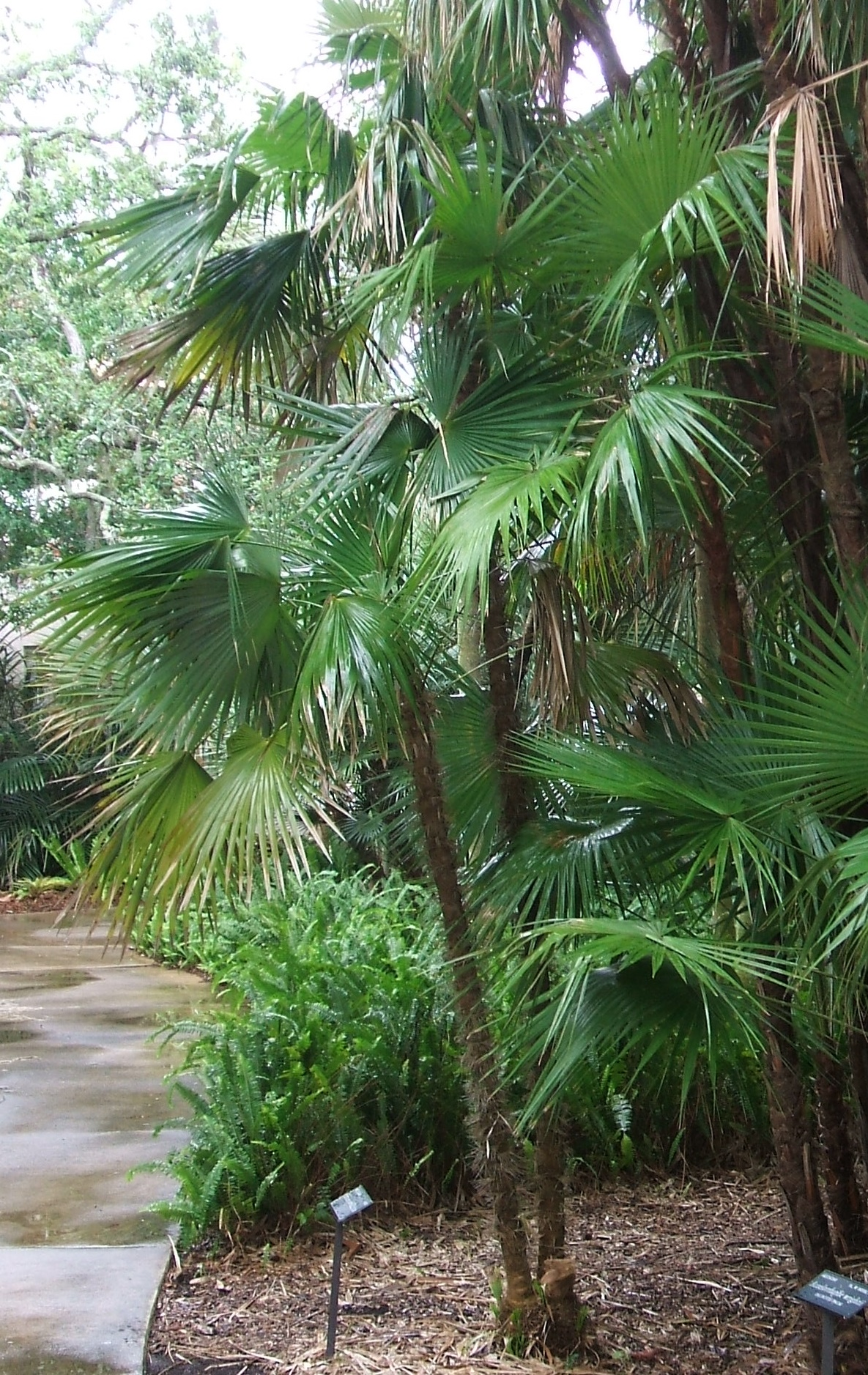
- At Marie Selby Botanical Gardens in Sarasota, Florida

Conservation status
- Vulnerable (IUCN 3.1)

Scientific classification
- Kingdom: Plantae
- Clade: Tracheophytes
- Clade: Angiosperms
- Clade: Monocots
- Clade: Commelinids
- Order: Arecales
- Family: Arecaceae
- Subfamily: Coryphoideae
- Tribe: Cryosophileae
- Genus: Zombia; L.H. Bailey
- Species: Z. antillarum

Binomial name
- Zombia antillarum (Desc.) L.H. Bailey

Synonyms
- Chamaerops antillarum Desc.; Coccothrinax anomala Becc.; Oothrinax anomala (Becc.) O.F.Cook; Zombia antillarum var. gonzalezii J.Jiménez Alm.

= Zombia =

Genus of palm endemic to Hispaniola

Zombia antillarum, commonly known as the zombie palm, is a species of palm tree and the only member of the genus Zombia. It is endemic to the island of Hispaniola (both the Dominican Republic and Haiti) in the Greater Antilles. Usually found in dry, hilly areas of northern and southern Haiti and the northwest of the Dominican Republic, Z. antillarum is a relatively short fan palm with clustered stems and a very distinctive appearance caused by its persistent spiny leaf sheaths. Threatened by habitat destruction in Haiti, Z. antillarum is a popular ornamental species due to its distinctive appearance, low maintenance requirements and salt tolerance.

== Description ==
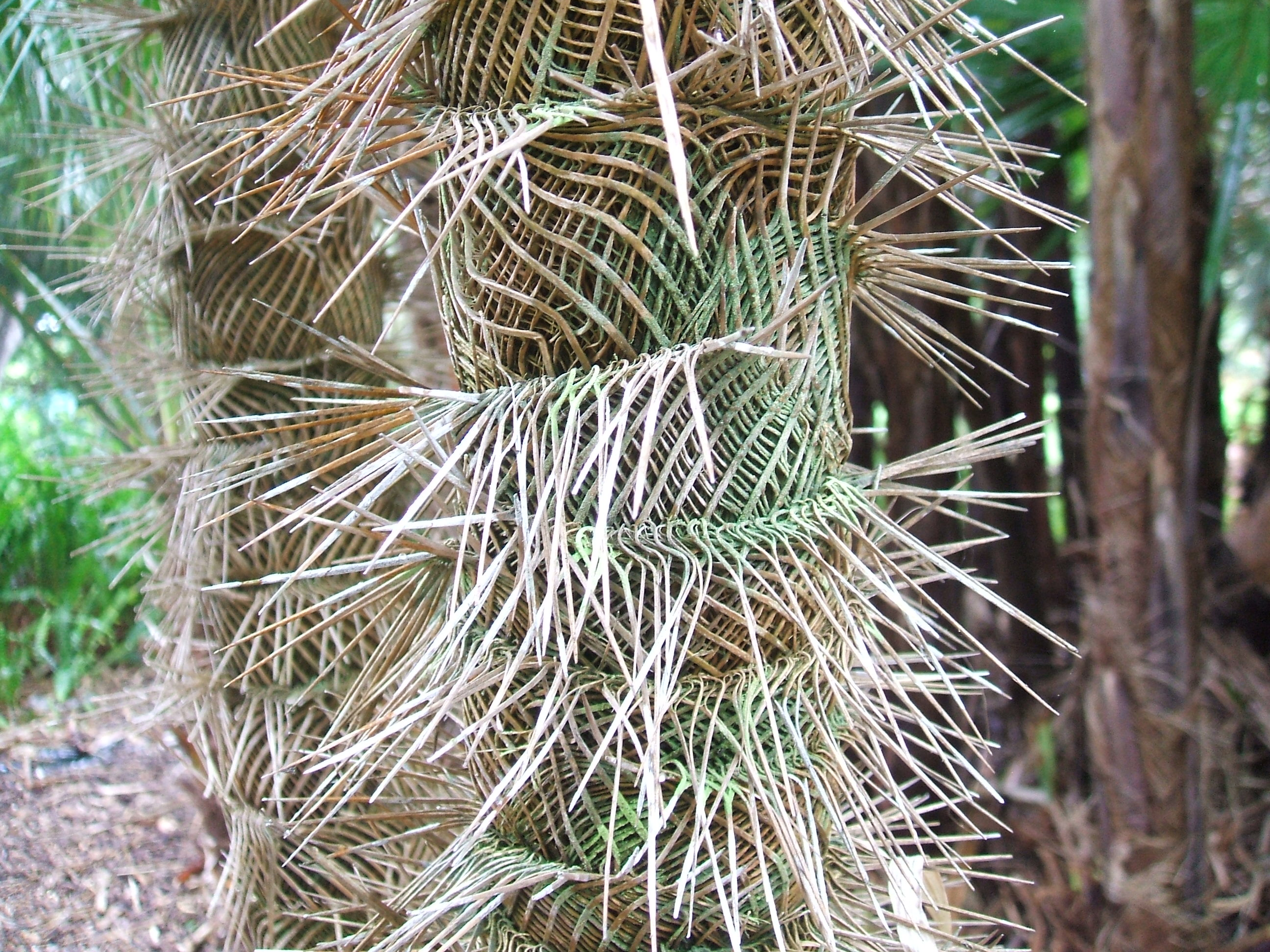
Stem details showing persistent, spiny leaf sheaths

Zombia antillarum is a small palm which grows in dense, multi-stemmed clumps with stems up to 3 metres (10 ft) tall and 5 centimetres (2 in) in diameter. Individuals bear nine to 12 fan-shaped (or palmate) leaves which are greyish-white on the lower surface. The leaf sheaths remain attached to the stem after the leaf drops off. The intervening tissue gradually degrades, and the woody vascular tissue splits, forming the spines which are characteristic of the species.

The inflorescence, which is shorter than the leaves, bears bisexual flowers with 9–12 stamens and a single carpel. Fruit are white in colour (although orange-fruited individuals are also known to exist), oblong or pear-shaped, 1.5–2 cm (0.6–0.8 in) in diameter and bear a single seed. The flowers and fruit are borne among the leaves due to the fact that the inflorescences are shorter than the leaves. Trees can produce 5000 seeds per year, predominantly in July and August.

The species is believed to be wind pollinated.

== Taxonomy ==
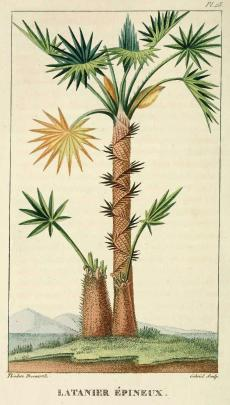
Descourtilz's original illustration of Zombia antillarum from Flore médicale des Antilles, 1821

Zombia is a monotypic genus: it includes only one species, Z. antillarum. The earliest description of the species is found in the work of French physician and botanist Michel Étienne Descourtilz. In 1821 he placed it in the genus Chamaerops as C. antillarum. Italian naturalist Odoardo Beccari independently described the species in 1908, placing it in the genus Coccothrinax (as C. anomala). Recognising that it was distinct enough to be placed in its own genus, American botanist Liberty Hyde Bailey erected the genus Zombia in 1931 to accommodate the species that Descourtilz had described. This generated the combination Z. antillarum. In selecting a name for the genus, Bailey noted that

"it would be preferable if this endemic palm could bear a Latin name indicative of its nativity rather than an exotic binomial of no relation with its country and the people".

In 1941, another American botanist, Orator F. Cook, moved Beccari's C. anomala to a new genus, Oothrinax. This generated a fourth combination, O. anomala. Since Descourtilz's description pre-dates that of Beccari, Zombia antillarum (which is based on Descourtilz's description) has priority over Oothrinax anomala. In addition, Cook's name is invalid, since it was never formally described.

In the first edition of Genera Palmarum (1987), Natalie Uhl and John Dransfield placed the genus in subfamily Coryphoideae, tribe Corypheae and subtribe Thrinacinae using Harold E. Moore's 1973 classification of the palm family. Subsequent phylogenetic analyses showed that the Old World and New World members of the Thrinacinae were not closely related. As a result, Zombia and related genera were places in their own tribe, Cryosophileae. Within this tribe, Zombia appears to be most closely related to the genera Coccothrinax and Hemithrinax, and the species Thrinax morrisii, with the remainder of the genus Thrinax being a sister taxon to this group. Because of this, T. morrisii was moved to a new genus, Leucothrinax.

In 1960, Dominican botanist José de Jesús Jiménez Almonte described a variety of Z. antillarum, which was distinguished from the typical variety by its smaller, pear-shaped fruits with a "dirty yellow" colour. He named this variety Z. antillarum var. gonzalezii. More recent workers have not considered this form distinctive enough to maintain it as a distinct variety.

=== Evolutionary history ===
- Cryosophileae
  - Trithrinax
  - - - Itaya
      - Sabinaria
    - - Chelyocarpus
      - - Cryosophila
        - - - Schippia
            - - Thrinax
              - - Leucothrinax
                - Hemithrinax
          - - Zombia
            - Coccothrinax

Simplified phylogeny of the Cryosophileae based on four nuclear genes and the matK plastid gene.

Ángela Cano and collaborators concluded that the ancestors of the Cryosophileae and its sister taxon, the tribe Sabaleae probably evolved in North America during the late Cretaceous and dispersed to South America by the Eocene before re-invading North and Central America during the Oligocene. They concluded that it was more probable that the ancestors of Zombia colonised the Caribbean from North or Central America rather than from South America.

== Common names ==
Zombia antillarum is called the Zombie palm or Zombi palm by horticulturists. Orator F. Cook coined the name "Haitian cactus palm" due to the spiny appearance of its trunk. In Haiti, it is usually known as latanye zombi (latanier zombi in French; the zombie fan palm), or latanye pikan, (latanier piquant in French, the spiny fan palm). It is also called latanier savanne or latanier marron. Latanye or latanier is a common term for fan palms in Haiti, so these names ("savanna fan palm" and "wild fan palm") are not specific to this species; they are also used for several species of Coccothrinax. In the Dominican Republic, the species is called guanito or guanillo. These are diminutives of guano, which is used for several species of Coccothrinax and Thrinax. In his 1821 description of the species, Descourtilz used the name latanier épineux.

== Distribution ==
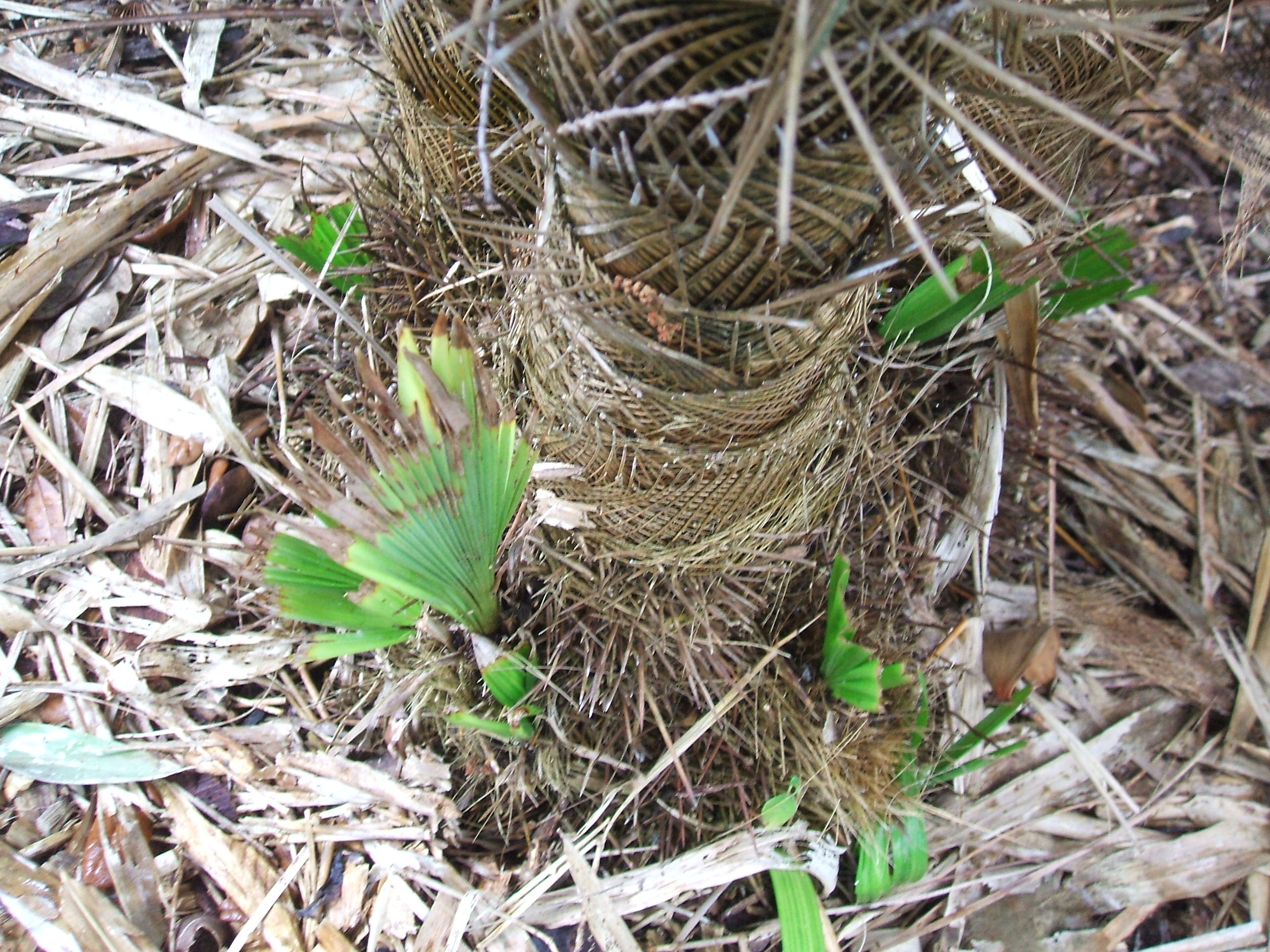
Base of the stem showing stem sprouts

Zombia antillarum is endemic to the island of Hispaniola. In northern Haiti, it grows along the tributaries of the Trois Rivières between Gros-Morne and Port-de-Paix, while in the south, it is found along the eastern edge of the Massif de la Hotte, between Miragoâne, Fond-des-Nègres and Fond-des-Blancs. The species also occurs in northwestern parts of the Dominican Republic, between Dajabón, Jarabacoa, the Sierra de Yamasá, Puerto Plata and Gaspar Hernández. It grows in dry, hilly regions at low elevation, usually on slopes and ridges, but is generally absent from valley bottoms. In the Dominican Republic, it is found from sea level up to 450 metres (1,480 ft) above sea level. Zombia antillarum is associated with serpentine soils, but is also found on calcareous soils. In Haiti, Z. antillarum grows in association with a variety of other palms, including Coccothrinax argentea, Bactris plumeriana, Roystonea borinquena, Sabal causiarum and S. domingensis. In the Dominican Republic, it grows in association with Pinus occidentalis, Calyptronoma rivalis, R. borinquena, S. domingensis, Copernicia berteroana and C. argentea.

=== Conservation status ===
Although listed as "not threatened" in the 2006 IUCN Red List, a 2007 review of the status of West Indian palms classified Zombia antillarum as vulnerable, based on a projected loss of 10% of the population over the next century. In Haiti especially, the species is threatened by habitat destruction when land is cleared for agriculture. Seedlings can also be destroyed when browsed by livestock. The 2016 Dominican Republic Vascular Plant Red List considered Z. antillarum to be Critically Endangered in the country using the IUCN Red List's ranking system.

== Uses ==
The plant is a popular ornamental, and is valued for its unusual appearance, low maintenance requirements, small stature and salt tolerance. It is recommended for low-maintenance landscaping in South Florida. Leaves of Z. antillarum are used to weave hats, make brooms and the seeds, which have a protein content of 2.8–4.9%, are used to feed pigs. South of Sabaneta in the Dominican Republic, the petioles are reportedly "used to mix manioc flour for making cassava bread."

In 1821, Michel Étienne Descourtilz reported that the wood was used for snuff boxes and tobacco cases, that the kernel of the seed was used to treat scurvy, and that the sap had been used by Taino Amerindians "for its powerful properties".

Fabienne Boncy Taylor and Joel C. Timyan explored the connection between the "zombie palm" and beliefs about zombies. They found that oil extracted from the seeds has been described as a "sense-activator" by one ethnographic source and can be used to "awaken" a zombie, and that a dwelling with thatch made from the leaves of the plant could prevent zombies from being used to spy on its occupants. Other sources, however, were reportedly unaware of these uses. Taylor and Timyan concluded that

"we were able to find a link, albeit weak, between the name Zombia and Haitian culture, even though we could not verify that this species is typically associated with zombies".
