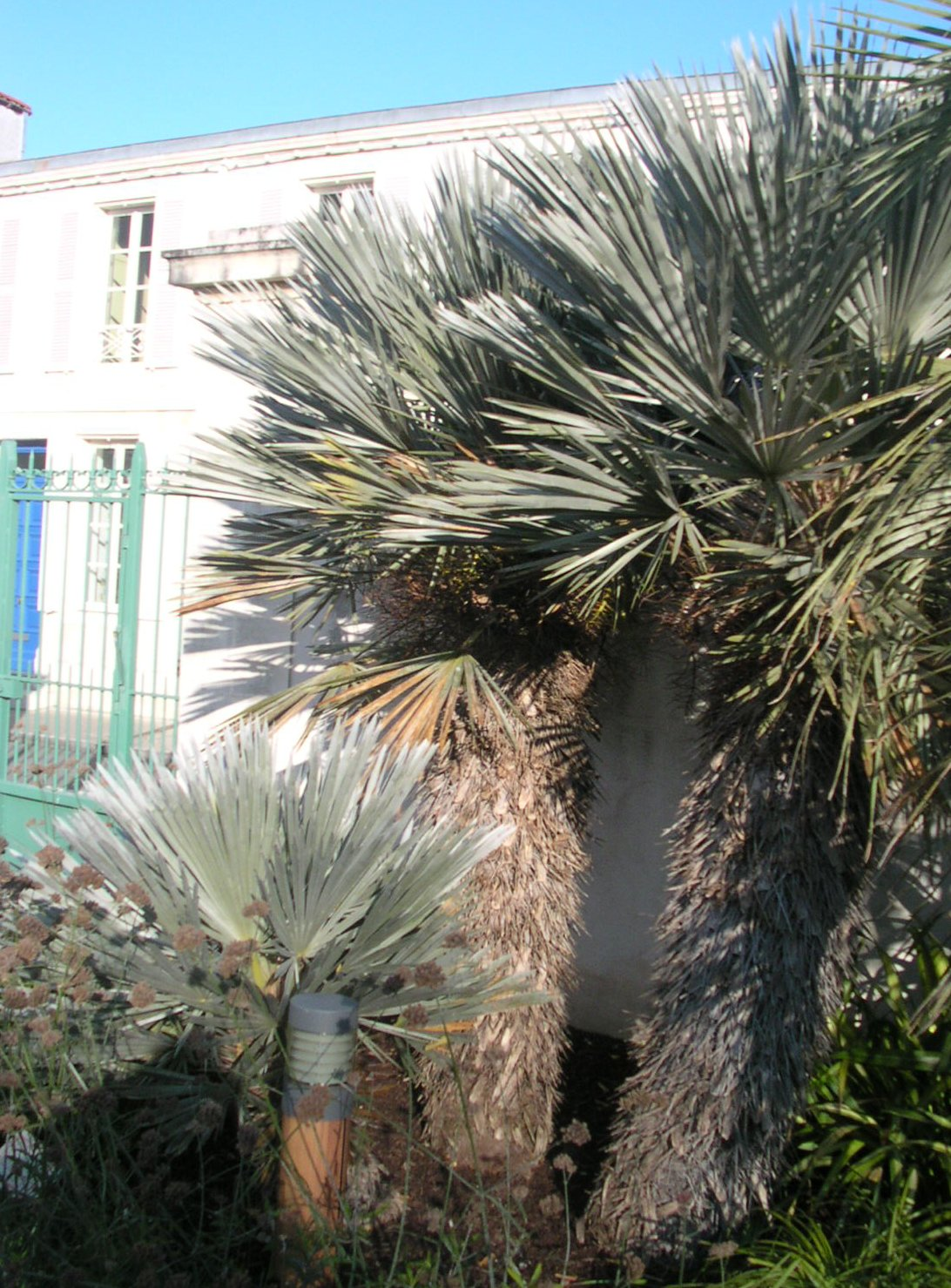
- Trithrinax campestris in a garden, grown as ornamental palm

Scientific classification
- Kingdom: Plantae
- Clade: Tracheophytes
- Clade: Angiosperms
- Clade: Monocots
- Clade: Commelinids
- Order: Arecales
- Family: Arecaceae
- Subfamily: Coryphoideae
- Tribe: Cryosophileae
- Genus: Trithrinax; Mart.

Species
- Trithrinax brasiliensis Mart. Trithrinax campestris (Burmeist.) Drude & Griseb. Trithrinax schizophylla Drude in Mart. Trithrinax acanthocoma Drude

= Trithrinax =

Genus of palms

Trithrinax is a genus of flowering plants in the subfamily Coryphoideae of the family Arecaceae. The name is derived from ancient Greek, where tri means three, and thrinax trident. It was named in 1837 by Carl Friedrich Philipp von Martius, a German botanist and explorer.

Trithrinax species are spiny fan palms native to South America. They are resistant to cold, heat, wind, drought, poor soils and other adverse environmental conditions. Seeds germinate fast, but their overall growth rate is distinctly slow.

== Description ==
Common features of Trithrinax species include:

- Flowers: Inflorescences, in the order of hundreds of units. Flowers with three sepals, three petals, six stamens and three carpels.
- Stem: Dead foliage is kept as a thick and spiny coat around the trunk.
- Leaves: Fan shaped (palmate), composed of strong resistant fibers.
- Shoots: Red coloured.

== Taxonomy ==
- NWTP
  - Sabaleae
    Sabal
  - Cryosophileae
    - Trithrinax
    - - - Itaya
        - Sabinaria
      - - Chelyocarpus
        - - Cryosophila
          - - - Schippia
              - - Thrinax
                - - Leucothrinax
                  - Hemithrinax
            - - Zombia
              - Coccothrinax

Simplified phylogeny of the New World thatch palms based on four nuclear genes and the matK plastid gene.

In the first edition of Genera Palmarum (1987), Natalie Uhl and John Dransfield placed the genus Trithrinax in subfamily Coryphoideae, tribe Corypheae and subtribe Thrinacinae. Subsequent phylogenetic analyses showed that the Old World and New World members of Thrinacinae are not closely related. As a consequence, Trithrinax and related genera have been placed in their own tribe, Cryosophileae.

== Habitat ==
Trithrinax species are spread along vast subtropical zones of South America: Bolivia, Brazil, Paraguay, Uruguay, Argentina. They prefer dry, open or forest clearing, environments, with moderate to cold winters.

== Usage ==
Leaf fibers are used as raw material for textiles, rustic clothing, and handicrafts. Oil can also be extracted from seeds. Fruits are sometimes used locally, fermented, to produce alcoholic beverages.
