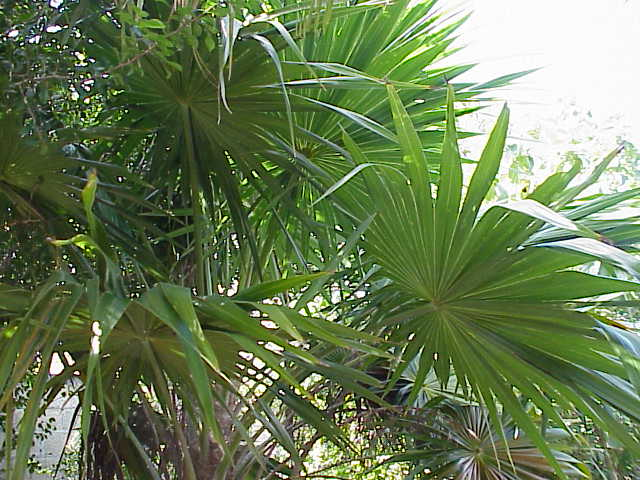
- Thrinax radiata

Scientific classification
- Kingdom: Plantae
- Clade: Tracheophytes
- Clade: Angiosperms
- Clade: Monocots
- Clade: Commelinids
- Order: Arecales
- Family: Arecaceae
- Subfamily: Coryphoideae
- Tribe: Cryosophileae
- Genus: Thrinax; L.f. ex Sw.

Species
- Thrinax excelsa Thrinax parviflora Thrinax radiata

Synonyms
- Porothrinax H.Wendl. ex Griseb.

= Thrinax =

Genus of palms

Thrinax is a genus in the palm family, native to the Caribbean. It is closely related to the genera Coccothrinax, Hemithrinax and Zombia. Flowers are small, bisexual and are borne on small stalks.

== Taxonomy ==
- Cryosophileae
  - Trithrinax
  - - - Itaya
      - Sabinaria
    - - Chelyocarpus
      - - Cryosophila
        - - - Schippia
            - - Thrinax
              - - Leucothrinax
                - Hemithrinax
          - - Zombia
            - Coccothrinax

Simplified phylogeny of the Cryosophileae based on four nuclear genes and the matK plastid gene.

In the first edition of Genera Palmarum (1987), Natalie Uhl and John Dransfield placed the genus Thrinax in subfamily Coryphoideae, tribe Corypheae and subtribe Thrinacinae. Subsequent phylogenetic analyses showed that the Old World and New World members of Thrinacinae are not closely related and as a consequence, Thrinax and related genera were transferred into their own tribe, Cryosophileae. In 2008, Leucothrinax morrisii (formerly T. morrisii) was split from Thrinax after phylogenetic studies showed that its inclusion in Thrinax would render that genus paraphyletic.

=== Species ===
Thrinax consists of three species.

Image	Scientific name	Distribution
	Thrinax excelsa	Jamaica
	Thrinax parviflora	Jamaica
	Thrinax radiata	Greater Antilles, the Bahamas, south Florida, Mexico and Central America.
