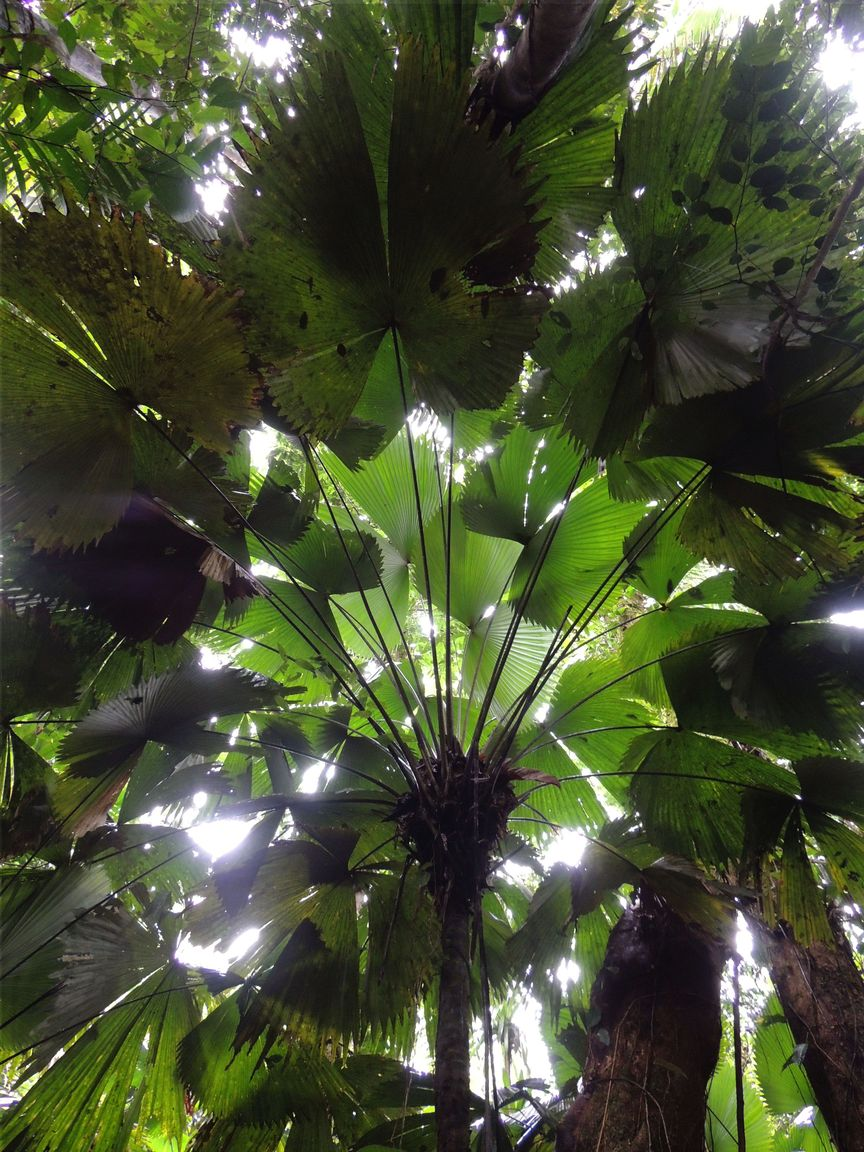

Scientific classification
- Kingdom: Plantae
- Clade: Tracheophytes
- Clade: Angiosperms
- Clade: Monocots
- Clade: Commelinids
- Order: Arecales
- Family: Arecaceae
- Subfamily: Coryphoideae
- Tribe: Cryosophileae
- Genus: Sabinaria; R.Bernal & Galeano
- Species: S. magnifica

Binomial name
- Sabinaria magnifica Galeano & R.Bernal

= Sabinaria =

Genus of palms

Sabinaria magnifica is a species of palm tree and the only member of the genus Sabinaria. Native to the Darién Gap on the border between Colombia and Panama, it grows from 1 to 6 metres (3 ft 3 in to 19 ft 8 in) tall with large, deeply-divided leaf blades. It has been described as "striking", "spectacular" and "beautiful" by taxonomists.

Although known by local mule drivers, it was first collected in April 2013 by Saúl Hoyos, and described scientifically by Colombian palm experts Gloria Galeano and Rodrigo Bernal who named the genus Sabinaria after their daughter. Despite being locally abundant, the limited range occupied by the species makes it vulnerable to habitat destruction.

== Description ==
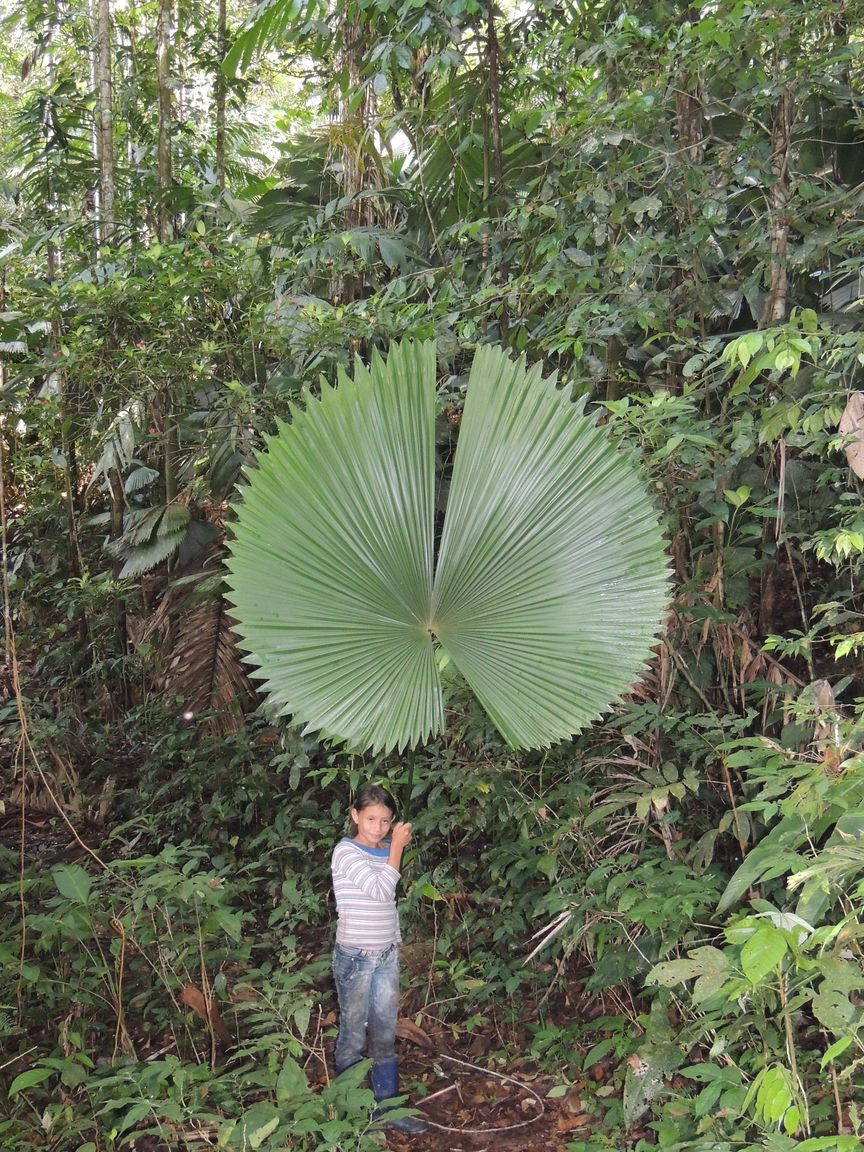
Leaf of Sabinaria magnifica.

Sabinaria magnifica is a single-stemmed palm tree with palmately-compound leaves. The trunk is 1–6 metres (3–20 ft) tall and 9–12 centimetres (4–5 in) in diameter. Leaves are borne at the end of a long petiole; the combined length of the leaf sheath and petiole averages 319 centimetres (126 in). Trees bear 20 to 35 leaves which are between 1.4 and 1.6 metres (5 and 5 ft) in diameter.

The leaves of S. magnifica are deeply divided in two almost to the base of the leaf blade, giving a butterfly-like appearance. They were described by British palm systematists William J. Baker and John Dransfield as "spectacular" and the most distinctive character of the genus.

Unlike other members of the tribe Cryosophileae (which tend to have bisexual flowers), S. magnifica is monoecious—it produces both male and female flowers. The male flowers are borne on the ends of the inflorescence while the female flowers are closer to the base and are surrounded by large bracts. The inflorescences are borne between the leaves on a peduncle that is at least 30 centimetres (12 in) long. The flowers are whitish; male flowers are 4–5 millimetres (0.16–0.20 in) long and 3–3.5 millimetres (0.12–0.14 in) wide, while the female flowers are 7–11 millimetres (0.28–0.43 in) long and about 2.5 millimetres (0.1 in) wide. The immature fruit are green and become yellowish-green as they mature. The ripe fruit are black. They are about 3.6–4.4 centimetres (1.4–1.7 in) long and 3–3.6 centimetres (1.2–1.4 in) wide. The seeds are 2.4–2.7 centimetres (0.94–1.06 in) long and 2.2–2.3 centimetres (0.87–0.91 in) wide.

== Taxonomy ==
- Cryosophileae
  - Trithrinax
  - - - Itaya
      - Sabinaria
    - - Chelyocarpus
      - - Cryosophila
        - - - Schippia
            - - Thrinax
              - - Leucothrinax
                - Hemithrinax
          - - Zombia
            - Coccothrinax

Simplified phylogeny of the Cryosophileae based on four nuclear genes and the matK plastid gene.

=== Scientific discovery ===
Although known by local mule drivers, the species was first collected by Saúl Hoyos, a Colombian botanist, in April 2013. Hoyos sent pictures of it to palm systematist Rodrigo Bernal. Based on the pictures, Bernal concluded that the palm was probably a new species in the Cryosophileae, and possibly an entirely new genus. This opinion that was shared by Bernal's partner and collaborator Gloria Galeano who described it as "the most beautiful of all Colombian palms".

A few months later Bernal, Galeano, Hoyos and Norman Echavarría returned to the site where Hoyos had encountered the species and where they were able to collect additional samples, including flowers and fruit. These allowed them to conclude that this was a new genus. Ten days after returning from the expedition, the manuscript formally describing the new genus, Sabinaria, and the species S. magnifica was submitted to the journal Phytotaxa, and was formally published in November 2013.

Bernal and Galeano named the genus after their daughter, Sabina. The specific epithet is a reference to the "strikingly beautiful aspect of the palm"; they originally intended to name the species after Saúl Hoyos, but after concluding that "the name this unique palm would be given might be vital for its future conservation", they decided on magnifica.

Using morphological characteristics, they placed the genus in the tribe Cryosophileae and commented on its similarity to the genus Itaya. A phylogenetic study by Ángela Cano and collaborators confirmed the placement of Sabinaria in the Cryosophileae based on four nuclear genes and the matK plastid gene. This analysis also identified Itaya as a sister genus to Sabinaria.

=== Evolutionary history ===
Ángela Cano and collaborators concluded that the ancestors of the Cryosophileae and its sister taxon, the tribe Sabaleae probably evolved in North America during the late Cretaceous and dispersed to South America by the Eocene, where Sabinaria evolved.

== Distribution ==
Sabinaria magnifica is one of two palm species known to be endemic to the Darién Gap on the border between Colombia and Panama. It was first discovered near the base of the Serranía del Darién in Colombia in premontane moist forest-warm transition (according to the Holdridge life zone system), and was subsequently recorded on the Panamanian side of the border. Although locally common, the limited range makes the species vulnerable to habitat destruction; between 2014 and 2015 a portion of the forest where the species was first discovered was cleared for agriculture.
