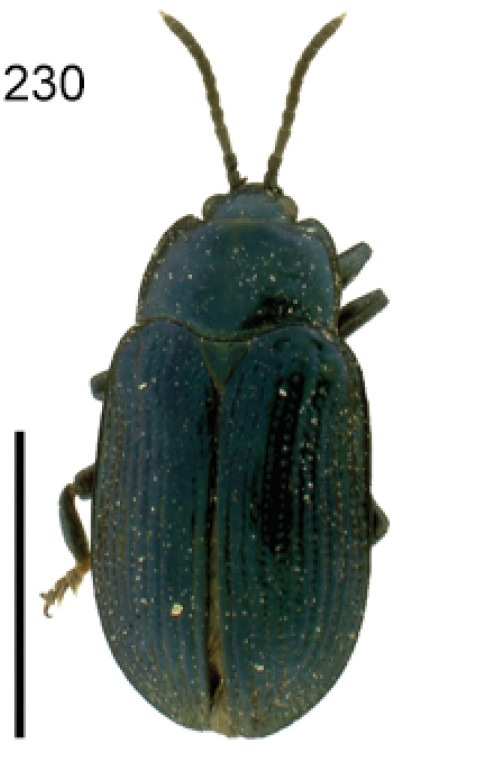

Scientific classification
- Kingdom: Animalia
- Phylum: Arthropoda
- Clade: Pancrustacea
- Class: Insecta
- Order: Coleoptera
- Suborder: Polyphaga
- Infraorder: Cucujiformia
- Family: Chrysomelidae
- Genus: Cephaloleia
- Species: C. sandersoni

Binomial name
- Cephaloleia sandersoni Staines, 1996

= Cephaloleia sandersoni =

Species of beetle

Cephaloleia sandersoni is a species of beetle of the family Chrysomelidae. It is found in Jamaica.

== Description ==
Adults reach a length of about 4.7–5.4 mm. Adults are metallic blue, with the venter and legs dark brown with a bluish sheen.

== Biology ==
Adults have been collected in the inflorescences of Thrinax species.
