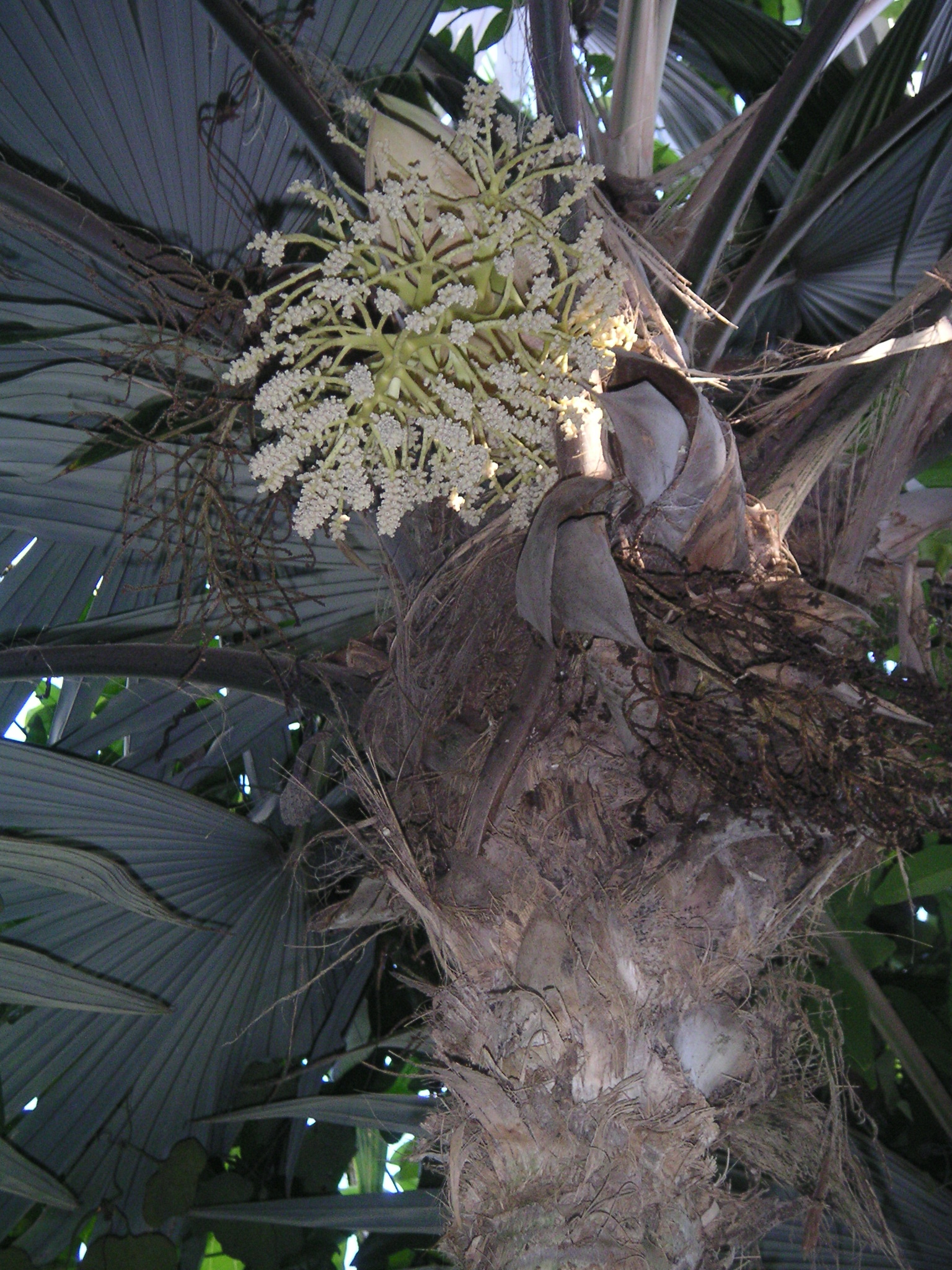
- Cryosophila warscewiczii at the Royal Botanic Gardens, Kew

Scientific classification
- Kingdom: Plantae
- Clade: Embryophytes
- Clade: Tracheophytes
- Clade: Spermatophytes
- Clade: Angiosperms
- Clade: Monocots
- Clade: Commelinids
- Order: Arecales
- Family: Arecaceae
- Subfamily: Coryphoideae
- Tribe: Cryosophileae; J.Dransf, N.W.Uhl, C.Asmussen, W.J.Baker, M.M.Harley & C.Lewis

Type genus
- Cryosophila Blume

Genera
- Coccothrinax Sarg. Chelyocarpus Dammer; Cryosophila Blume; Hemithrinax Hook.f. Itaya H.E.Moore; Leucothrinax C.Lewis & Zona; Sabinaria R.Bernal & Galeano; Schippia Burret; Thrinax L.f. ex Sw. Trithrinax Mart. Zombia L.H.Bailey

= Cryosophileae =

Tribe of palms

Cryosophileae is a tribe of palms in the subfamily Coryphoideae. The tribe ranges from southern South America, through Central America, into Mexico and the Caribbean. It includes New World genera formerly included in the tribe Thrinacinae, which was split after molecular phylogenetic studies showed that Old World and New World members of the tribe were not closely related.

== Description ==
Members of the tribe are palms with fan shaped (or palmate) leaves and are pleonanthic—they flower repeatedly over the course of their lifespan. They are usually hermaphroditic (male and female sex organs are present together in flowers), but some species are polygamodioecious, in which some plants have both male and hermaphroditic flowers, while others have a mixture of female and hermaphroditic flowers.

== Taxonomy ==
- NWTP
  - Sabaleae
    Sabal
  - Cryosophileae
    - Trithrinax
    - - - Itaya
        - Sabinaria
      - - Chelyocarpus
        - - Cryosophila
          - - - Schippia
              - - Thrinax
                - - Leucothrinax
                  - Hemithrinax
            - - Zombia
              - Coccothrinax

Simplified phylogeny of the New World thatch palms based on four nuclear genes and the matK plastid gene.

The Cryosophileae is one of eight tribes within subfamily Coryphoideae. Within the subfamily, it is a sister taxon to the Sabaleae (which includes just a single genus, Sabal). Together these are sometimes referred to as the New World thatch palm clade.

In the first edition of Genera Palmarum (1987), Natalie Uhl and John Dransfield placed a variety of New World and Old World genera in the subtribe Thrinacinae. Subsequent phylogenetic analysis showed that the Old World and New World members of the Thrinacinae were not closely related. As a consequence of this, Dransfield and colleagues split the subtribe, and placed the New World species in a new tribe, the Cryosophileae, while the Old World species were placed in the subtribe Rhapidinae, which was transferred to the tribe Livistoneae. A new genus and species, Sabinaria magnifica, was described in 2013 and placed in this tribe.

=== Evolution ===
Andrew Henderson and colleagues considered the distribution of the tribe to suggest that its origins lay in the southern hemisphere. However, the discovery of fossil remains of Trithrinax in Caribbean amber from the Tertiary indicates that this genus, now the southernmost member of the Cryosophileae, once existed further to the north. This, coupled with the presence of Thrinax fossils from the Tertiary in Europe, and Cryosophila-like fossil pollen from Central America in the same time period, led Stine Bjorholm and colleagues to conclude that the current distribution of these palms represents northern hemisphere origin and a north-to-south migration, instead of the reverse. Cryosophileae are found in France during Oligocene (Rupelian) and Miocene (Tortonian).

== Distribution ==
The members of the Cryosophileae form a sequence of species that extends from southern South America through Central America and into Mexico and the Caribbean. The southernmost genus, Trithrinax, is found in subtropical parts of Argentina, Bolivia, Brazil, Paraguay and Uruguay, and includes some of the most cold-tolerant palms in the Americas. Chelyocarpus and Itaya are next in the sequence; Chelyocarpus and Itaya are found in the western Amazon basin—in Peru, Brazil and Ecuador—with one species of Chelyocarpus extending into the Pacific lowlands of Colombia. Sabinaria is restricted to the Colombia/Panama border. Cryosophila ranges from northern Colombia, through Central America into Mexico. Schippia is found in Belize and a small area of Guatemala. Thrinax, Coccothrinax and Leucothrinax are widespread in the northern Caribbean; Zombia is restricted the island of Hispaniola and Hemithrinax to Cuba.
