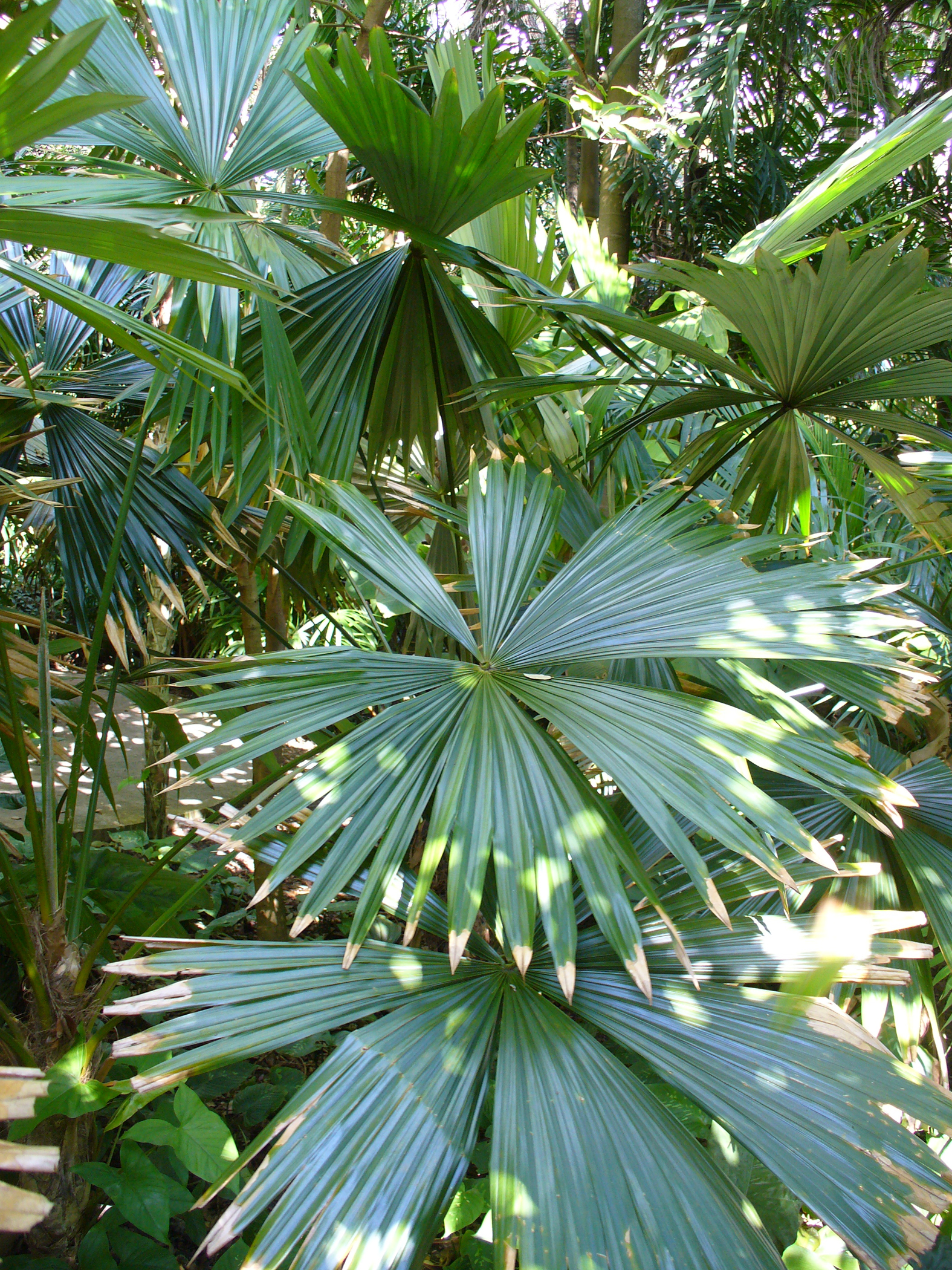

Scientific classification
- Kingdom: Plantae
- Clade: Tracheophytes
- Clade: Angiosperms
- Clade: Monocots
- Clade: Commelinids
- Order: Arecales
- Family: Arecaceae
- Genus: Chelyocarpus
- Species: C. ulei

Binomial name
- Chelyocarpus ulei Dammer

Synonyms
- Tessmanniophoenix longibracteata Burret

= Chelyocarpus ulei =

Species of palm

Chelyocarpus ulei is a species of palm tree that is native to the western Amazon.

== Description ==
Chelyocarpus ulei is a single-stemmed palm with fan-shaped leaves. The stem is 1 to 8 metres (3 ft 3.4 in to 26 ft 3.0 in) tall and 4 to 7 centimetres (1.6 to 2.8 in) in diameter. The plant is found in rainforest regions, usually under the 500m elevation. It is prevalent in Northern Brazil, Colombia, Ecuador, and Peru. It is harvested to make salt from the burned ashes of the trunk.

== Taxonomy ==
Chelyocarpus ulei was described by Carl Dammer in 1920.
