= Dammeri =

Dammeri is a specific epithet that refers to Carl Lebrecht Udo Dammer. It is found in the following species names:

- Cotoneaster dammeri, a plant species
- Rhodospatha dammeri, a plant species endemic to Ecuador
