= Chelyocarpus dianeurus =

Conservation status
- Least Concern (IUCN 3.1)

Scientific classification
- Kingdom: Plantae
- Clade: Tracheophytes
- Clade: Angiosperms
- Clade: Monocots
- Clade: Commelinids
- Order: Arecales
- Family: Arecaceae
- Genus: Chelyocarpus
- Species: C. dianeurus

Binomial name
- Chelyocarpus dianeurus (Burret) H.E.Moore

Species of palm

Chelyocarpus dianeurus is a species of flowering plant in the family Arecaceae. The palm tree is endemic to Colombia. It is found in the Pacific lowlands of the country, occurring on well-drained soils. It is a single-stemmed (trunked) palm. Leaf sheath fibre is used locally for pillow stuffing.
