= William A. Schipp =

William Augustus Schipp (1891–1967) was an Australian-born explorer and botanist. Active in collecting plants in Northern Australia, New Guinea and Java, he moved to British Honduras (Belize), where he collected from 1929 to 1935. Because of failing health, Schipp relocated to Australia again and worked as a landscape gardener, where he died in 1967.

== Biography ==
William was born in Silverton, near Broken Hill, New South Wales to Christian and Barbara Schipp (née McNair). Christian, a builder and bricklayer, had come from Germany in 1855 and followed the gold rush to Broken Hill and then Kalgoorlie, Western Australia. William was the youngest of five children. He studied botany, especially flowering tropical plants.

Schipp worked in the Darwin Botanical Gardens and collected plants in New Guinea, Java and Dutch East Indies for several years prior to 1929 before moving to Belize.

Schipp came to San Francisco, California from Tjondong, Tjikandang, Java in late January 1929. At the University of California, Berkeley, he spent several days with ED Merrill. Schipp left San Francisco for New Orleans where he boarded the SS Abargarez for British Honduras. On the evening of 28 January 1929 he arrived at Belize. Early in February 1929 Schipp left Belize for the Stann Creek District directly south of Belize District where he started collecting twenty specimens of each taxon in order to fulfill requests of his subscribers.

He made the first comprehensive collection of Belize botany. His collections from British Honduras are in many herbaria. Herbarium sets distributed by Schipp to European and American institutions represent one of the most significant and extensive collections ever made of the coastal plain flora for the Stann Creek and Toledo Districts of southern British Honduras. He compiled the first complete flora of these districts in the form of a Catalogue entitled "Flora of the British Honduras, Pricelist of Seeds & Herbarium Material".

As a professional botanical explorer, his discrimination in the field yielded a total of 154 taxa new to science, including two new genera - Schippia and Schizocardia. The most complete collections are thought to be at the Field Museum in Chicago and the Gentle Herbarium in Belmopan, Belize.
