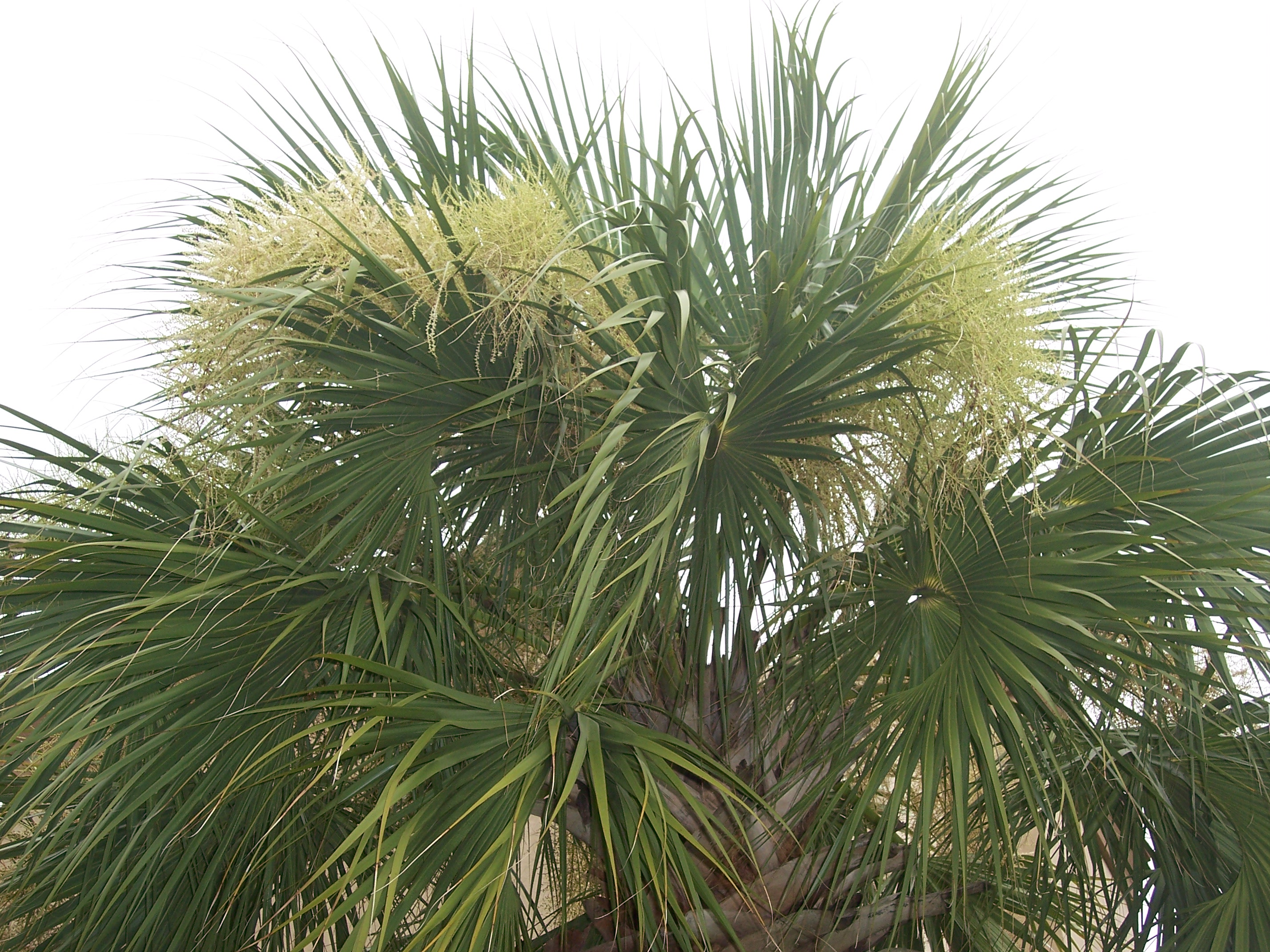
- Sabal palmetto

Scientific classification
- Kingdom: Plantae
- Clade: Embryophytes
- Clade: Tracheophytes
- Clade: Angiosperms
- Clade: Monocots
- Clade: Commelinids
- Order: Arecales
- Family: Arecaceae
- Subfamily: Coryphoideae; Burnett

Tribes
- Borasseae; Caryoteae; Chuniophoeniceae; Corypheae; Cryosophileae; Phoeniceae; Sabaleae; Trachycarpeae

= Coryphoideae =

Coryphoideae Temporal range: Campanian–present

Subfamily of palms

The Coryphoideae is one of five subfamilies in the palm family, Arecaceae. It contains all of the genera with palmate leaves, excepting Mauritia, Mauritiella and Lepidocaryum, all of subfamily Calamoideae, tribe Lepidocaryeae, subtribe Mauritiinae. The subfamily comprises approximately 46 genera and more than 400 species, with members occurring across tropical, subtropical, and warm temperate regions worldwide, best known for their palmate or costapalmate (“fan”) leaves. Historically, this leaf form played a disproportionate role in palm classification, leading to the long-standing assumption that all fan palms represented a single, closely related evolutionary lineage. However, all Coryphoideae palm leaves have induplicate (V-shaped) leaf folds (excepting Guihaia), while Calamoideae palms have reduplicate (inverted V-shaped) leaf folds. Pinnate leaves do occur in Coryphoideae, in Phoenix, Arenga, Wallichia and bipinnate in Caryota.

Coryphoids are well-represented in the fossil record from the Late Cretaceous (Campanian) onwards, primarily because of the presence of the form genus Sabalites.

Early palm taxonomies of the eighteenth and nineteenth centuries relied heavily on vegetative morphology, particularly leaf architecture and growth form, due to the lack of alternative data sources. Within this framework, Coryphoideae was implicitly treated as a natural group defined by palmate leaves. However, comparative studies in the twentieth century increasingly demonstrated that many vegetative traits emphasized in early classifications are evolutionarily labile and often shaped by ecological and mechanical constraints rather than shared ancestry. Anatomical research on palm stems further undermined traditional assumptions by showing that palms lack secondary growth and achieve arborescence through specialized primary thickening growth, decoupling tree-like form from phylogenetic primitiveness.

The introduction of molecular phylogenetic methods in the late twentieth century fundamentally reshaped understanding of Coryphoideae. Early plastid DNA analyses demonstrated that palmate leaf morphology evolved multiple times independently within Arecaceae, invalidating the assumption that fan palms formed a single evolutionary lineage. Family-wide plastid phylogenies required substantial redefinition of Coryphoideae to recover it as a monophyletic group and revealed that many historically emphasized characters such as leaf shape, degree of segmentation, and general habit carry limited phylogenetic signal at higher taxonomic levels.

Recent phylogenomic studies using complete plastome sequences and low-copy nuclear genes have provided a robust backbone for Coryphoideae classification. These analyses consistently resolve internal structure within the subfamily and recover a well-supported clade comprising Cryosophileae, Sabaleae, Phoeniceae, and Trachycarpeae (the CSPT clade). Divergence-time estimates place the origin of Coryphoideae in the Late Cretaceous, suggesting that the subfamily represents an early radiation within palms, with subsequent diversification shaped by long-distance dispersal, climatic change, and ecological tolerance rather than by conserved vegetative morphology.

== Classification ==
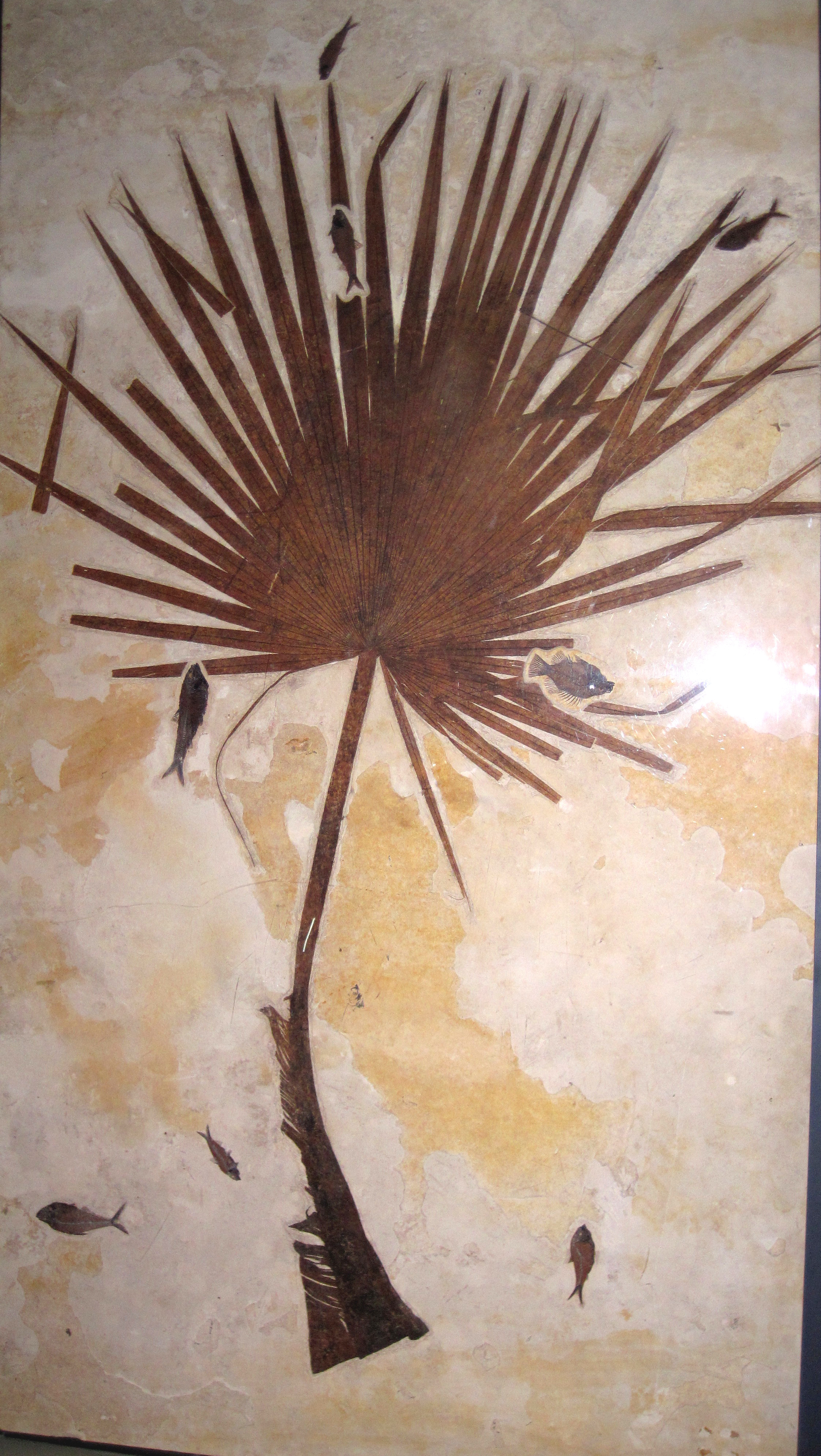
Sabalites is a coryphoid leaf fossil common in the fossil record

Subfamily Coryphoideae is divided into 8 tribes:

- Sabaleae
  - Sabal
- Cryosophileae
  - Schippia
  - Trithrinax
  - Zombia
  - Coccothrinax
  - Hemithrinax
  - Thrinax
  - Chelyocarpus
  - Cryosophila
  - Itaya
  - Sabinaria
- Phoeniceae
  - Phoenix
- Trachycarpeae
  - Chamaerops
  - Guihaia
  - Trachycarpus
  - Rhapidophyllum
  - Maxburretia
  - Rhapis
  - Livistona
  - Licuala
  - Lanonia
  - Johannesteijsmannia
  - Pholidocarpus
  - Saribus
  - Acoelorraphe
  - Serenoa
  - Brahea
  - Colpothrinax
  - Copernicia
  - Pritchardia
  - Washingtonia
- Chuniophoeniceae
  - Chuniophoenix
  - Kerriodoxa
  - Nannorrhops
  - Tahina
- Caryoteae
  - Caryota
  - Arenga
  - Wallichia
- Corypheae
  - Corypha
- Borasseae
  - Bismarckia
  - Satranala
  - Hyphaene
  - Medemia
  - Latania
  - Lodoicea
  - Borassodendron
  - Borassus
- Unplaced genera
  - † Uhlia
  - † Palaeoraphe
  - † Sabalites

The genus Sabinaria was discovered and described after the classification used here was published, but its morphology clearly places it in tribe Cryosophileae. The genus Saribus was split from Livistona, while Lanonia was split from Licuala, also after publication. Tribe Trachycarpeae was initially described as tribe 'Livistoneae', but the name Trachycarpeae has priority. Also Uhlia is an extinct genus described from permineralized remains recovered from the Ypresian Princeton Chert in British Columbia, Canada.
