= Carl Lebrecht Udo Dammer =

German botanist

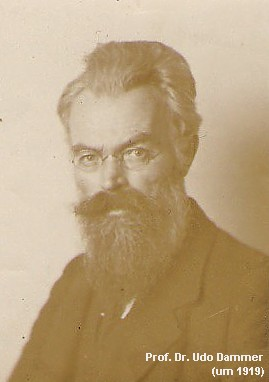
- Udo Dammer in 1919
- Born: January 8, 1860
- Died: November 15, 1920 (aged 60)
- Education: University of Freiburg
- Scientific career
- Fields: Botany
- Author abbrev. (botany): Dammer

Carl Lebrecht Udo Dammer (born 8 January 1860 in Apolda, died 15 November 1920 in Großrambin near Kołobrzeg) was a German botanist. Dammer was also interested in entomology.

He was the son of Otto Dammer (1839–1916), an early advocate of the labor and Social Democratic movement in Germany. Udo Dammer studied natural sciences in Berlin, and worked at the Botanical Garden in St. Petersburg from 1882 to 1886. Her earned in Ph.D. at the University of Freiburg in 1888. From 1889, he worked at the Royal Botanical Museum in Berlin. Dammer founded and edited the journal Blätter für Pflanzenfreunde.

== Works ==
- Handbuch für Pflanzensammler. Stuttgart 1891.
- Anleitung für Pflanzensammler. Stuttgart 1894.
- Zimmerblattpflanzen. Berlin 1899.
- Balkonpflanzen. Berlin 1899.
- Theorie der Gartenarbeiten. Berlin 1899.
- Nadelhölzer. Berlin 1900.
- Palmen. Berlin 1900.
- Unsere Blumen und Pflanzen im Garten. Leipzig 1912.
- Schädlichen und der Essbar Taschenatlas Pilze. Esslingen aN 1914.
- Über die der Aufzucht Seidenspinners Raupe des ... . Frankfurt (Oder) 1915
- Wie wir ziehen Gemüse am besten? Berlin 1916.

== Honours ==
Named in his honor:

- Dammeria K. Schum. & Lauterbad. in the family Arecaceae
- Dammeri is a specific epithet that refers to Carl Lebrecht Udo Dammer
