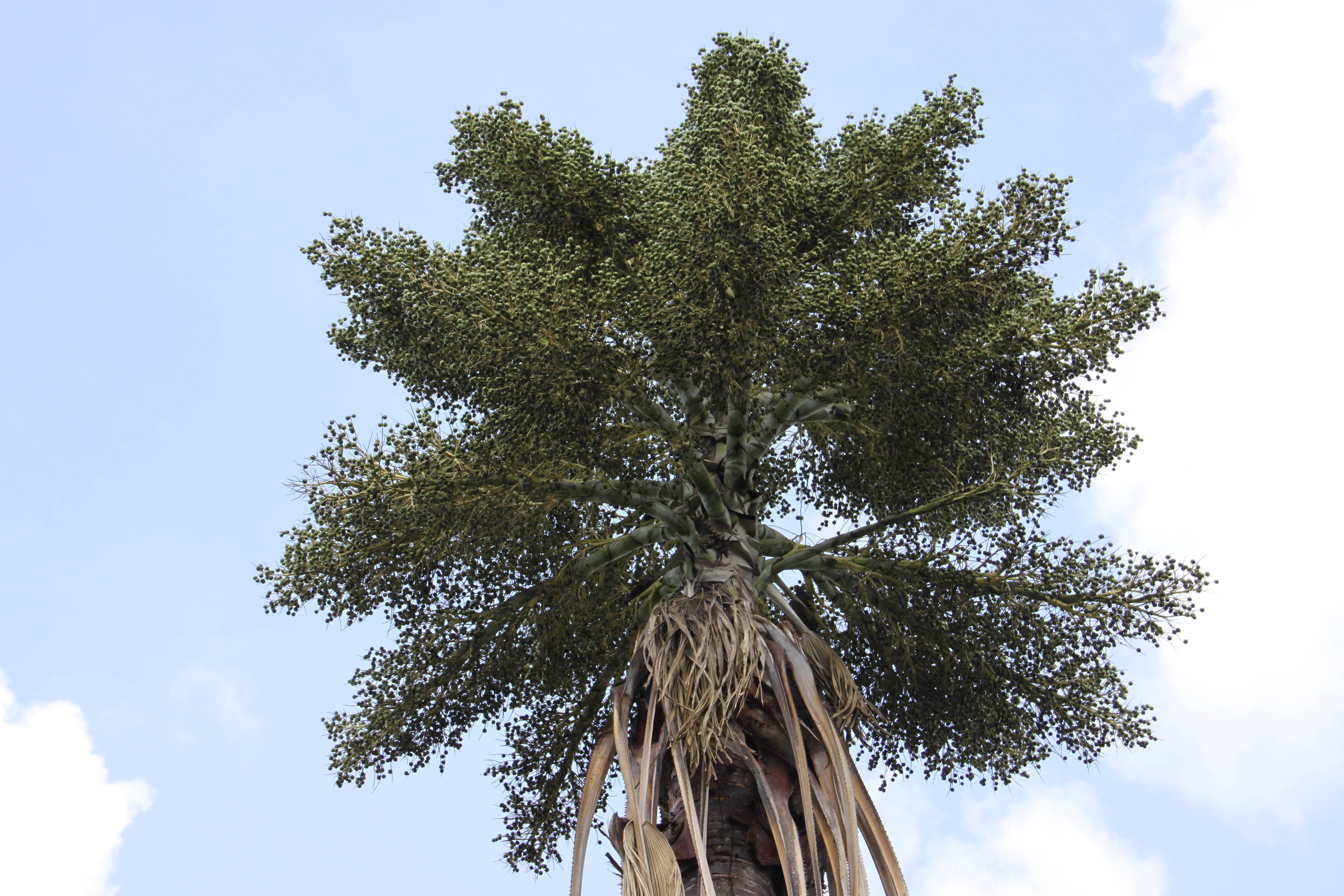
- Corypha utan

Scientific classification
- Kingdom: Plantae
- Clade: Tracheophytes
- Clade: Angiosperms
- Clade: Monocots
- Clade: Commelinids
- Order: Arecales
- Family: Arecaceae
- Subfamily: Coryphoideae
- Tribe: Corypheae; Martinov

Type genus
- Corypha L.

Genera
- Corypha

= Corypheae =

Tribe of palms

Corypheae is a tribe of palm trees in the subfamily Coryphoideae. In previous classifications, tribe Corypheae included four subtribes: Coryphinae, Livistoninae, Thrinacinae and Sabalinae, but recent phylogenetic studies have led to the genera within these subtribes being transferred into other tribes (Chuniophoeniceae, Trachycarpeae, Cryosophileae and Sabaleae). Tribe Corypheae is now restricted to the genus Corypha alone.
