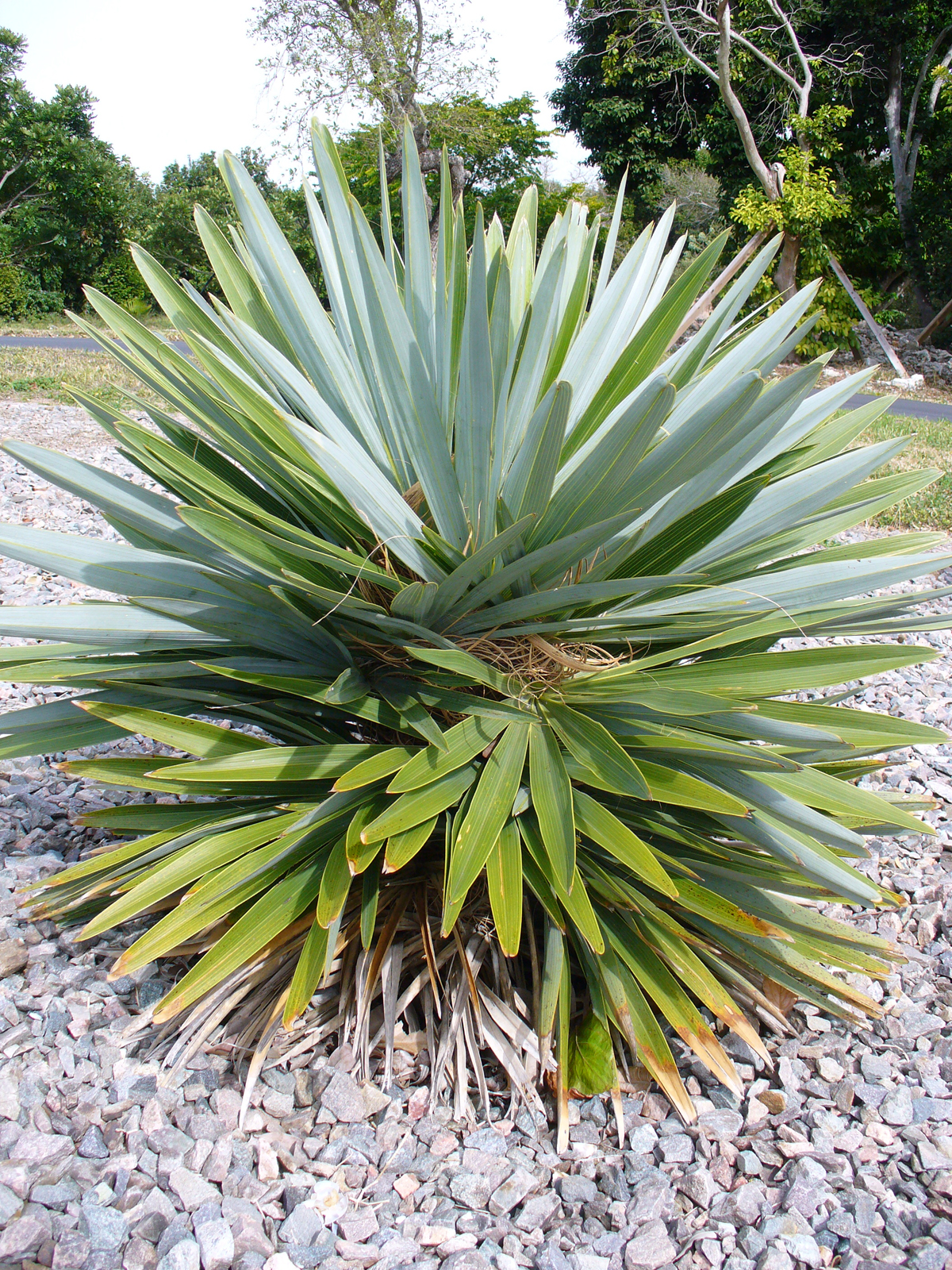
- Hemithrinax ekmaniana

Scientific classification
- Kingdom: Plantae
- Clade: Tracheophytes
- Clade: Angiosperms
- Clade: Monocots
- Clade: Commelinids
- Order: Arecales
- Family: Arecaceae
- Subfamily: Coryphoideae
- Tribe: Cryosophileae
- Genus: Hemithrinax; Hook.f.

Type species
- Hemithrinax compacta (Griseb. & H. Wendl.) Hook.f.

= Hemithrinax =

Genus of palms

Hemithrinax is a genus of palms that is endemic to eastern Cuba. It comprises three species and one variety and was previously included within the genus Thrinax.

- Hemithrinax compacta (Griseb. & H.Wendl.) M.Gómez - Sierra de Nipe in Holguin Province
- Hemithrinax ekmaniana Burret - Las Villas in Granma Province
- Hemithrinax rivularis León - Sierra de Moa in Holguin Province
  - Hemithrinax rivularis var. savannarum (León) O.Muñiz - Oriente and Sierra de Moa in Holguin Province.
