= Nuclear gene =

Gene located in the cell nucleus of a eukaryote

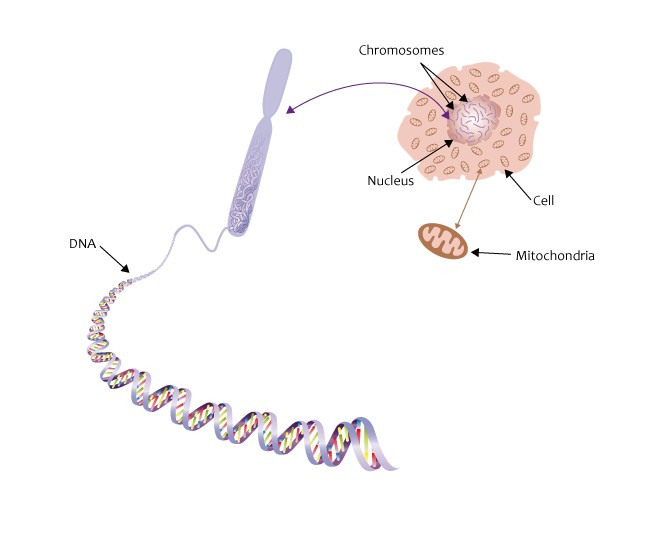
Nuclear gene location

A nuclear gene is a gene whose DNA sequence is located within the cell nucleus of a eukaryotic organism. These genes with nuclear DNA are distinguished from extranuclear genes, such as those found in the genomes of mitochondria and chloroplasts, which reside outside the nucleus in their own organellar DNA. Nuclear genes encode the majority of proteins and functional RNAs required for cellular processes, including development, metabolism, and regulation.

Unlike the small, circular genomes of mitochondria and chloroplasts, nuclear genes are organized into linear chromosomes and are typically inherited in a Mendelian fashion, following the laws of segregation and independent assortment. In contrast, extranuclear genes often exhibit non-Mendelian inheritance, such as maternal inheritance in mitochondrial DNA.

While the vast majority of eukaryotic genes are nuclear, exceptions exist in certain protists and algae, where some genes have migrated from organelles to the nucleus over evolutionary time through endosymbiotic gene transfer. The study of nuclear genes is fundamental to genetics, molecular biology, and biotechnology, as they play a central role in gene expression, heredity, and genetic engineering.

== History ==
The study of nuclear genes traces all the way back to the discovery of the nucleus in the 19th century, but the evolutionary origin of nuclear genes became clearer with the advances within molecular biology. Early work by Lynn Margulis in the 1960s proposed that mitochondria descended from free-living bacteria engulfed by a host cell, a process called endosymbiosis. This theory explains a process called endosymbiotic gene transfer which is how many genes from these endosymbionts were transferred to the host's nuclear genome over time.

Diagram of endosymbiotic gene transfer, showing how nuclear genes acquired bacterial (mitochondrial) and archaeal components.

Further research later revealed that nuclear genes have a mosaic ancestry which means that while some nuclear genes derive from the mitochondrial or bacterial ancestors, others will trace back to an archaeal host or arise as eukaryotic innovations. Carl Woese’s three-domain system, written in 1977, reinforced this view by showing the eukaryotes’ deep evolutionary ties to archaea. Today, nuclear genes are understood to be a composite of archaeal, bacterial, and uniquely eukaryotic elements, reflecting the complex history of the eukaryotic cell.

== Function and importance ==
Nuclear genes play a central role in nearly all aspects of eukaryotic biology, encoding the majority of proteins and regulatory RNAs necessary for cellular function. Unlike organellar genes (e.g., mitochondrial or chloroplast DNA), which are limited to a small number of metabolic and energy-related processes, nuclear genes govern development, growth, reproduction, and homeostasis. (Note: Alberts, Bruce. (2022). "The Structure and Function of Nuclear Genes". Molecular Biology of the Cell (7th ed.). New York, NY : W.W. Norton & Company. ISBN 9780393884821.) They are transcribed in the nucleus and often translated in the cytoplasm, with their products directed to various organelles, including mitochondria and chloroplasts, through specialized signaling sequences. (Note: Lodish H (2021). "Gene Expression in the Nucleus". Molecular Cell Biology (8th ed.). W.H. Freeman. ISBN 978-1-319-20863-8.)

The regulation of nuclear genes is highly complex, involving mechanisms such as transcription factors, epigenetic modifications, and non-coding RNAs. This allows for precise control over gene expression in response to environmental signals, cellular stress, or developmental stages. (Note: Watson JD (2014). "Gene Regulation". Molecular Biology of the Gene (7th ed.). Pearson. ISBN 978-0-321-76243-6.)

For example, homeobox genes—a critical class of nuclear genes—orchestrate body plan development in animals, while nuclear-encoded photosynthesis genes in plants regulate chloroplast function. (Note: Griffiths, Anthony J. F. (2020). "Nuclear Genes in Development". Introduction to Genetic Analysis (12th ed.). New York, NY: W.H. Freeman. ISBN 9781319114770.) Nuclear genes are also of paramount importance in medicine and biotechnology. Mutations in these genes are linked to thousands of genetic disorders, including cancers, metabolic syndromes, and neurodegenerative diseases. (Note: Alberts, Bruce (2017). "Nuclear Gene Mutations and Disease". Cells (7th ed.). Garland Science. ISBN 978-0-8153-4456-6.) Additionally, nuclear genes are primary targets for genetic engineering—CRISPR-Cas9 and other gene-editing technologies predominantly modify nuclear DNA to study gene function or develop therapies. (Note: Doudna JA, Charpentier E (2014). "The new frontier of genome engineering with CRISPR-Cas9". Science. 346 (6213): 1258096. doi:10.1126/science.1258096. PMID 25430774.)

Finally, nuclear genes provide key insights into evolutionary biology. Comparative genomics of nuclear DNA across species helps trace evolutionary relationships, while endosymbiotic gene transfer—the migration of genes from organelles to the nucleus—reveals how eukaryotic cells evolved. (Note: Timms RJ, Nyati MK, Hua KW, Gray MW (February 2024). "Endosymbiotic gene transfer: organelle genomes forge eukaryotic chromosomes". Nature Reviews Genetics. 8 (2): 123–135. doi:10.1038/nrg1217. PMID 14715242.) Thus, nuclear genes are not only essential for organismal survival but also serve as a cornerstone for genetic research and biotechnological innovation.

== Endosymbiotic theory ==
Mitochondria and plastids evolved from free-living prokaryotes into current cytoplasmic organelles through endosymbiotic evolution. (Note: Timms RJ, Nyati MK, Hua KW, Gray MW (February 2024). "Endosymbiotic gene transfer: organelle genomes forge eukaryotic chromosomes". Nature Reviews Genetics. 8 (2): 123–135. doi:10.1038/nrg1217. PMID 14715242.)

Mitochondria are thought to be necessary for eukaryotic life to exist. They are known as the cell's powerhouses because they provide the majority of the energy or ATP required by the cell. The mitochondrial genome (mtDNA) is replicated separately from the host genome. Human mtDNA codes for 13 proteins, most of which are involved in oxidative phosphorylation (OXPHOS). The nuclear genome encodes the remaining mitochondrial proteins, which are then transported into the mitochondria. (Note: Klein HL, Petes RR (2017-05-01). "Mitochondria in Health and Disease". Cells. 6 (7): 680. doi:10.3390/cells6070680. PMID 37204590. PMC 6762092.) The genomes of these organelles have become far smaller than those of their free-living predecessors. This is mostly due to the widespread transfer of genes from prokaryote progenitors to the nuclear genome, followed by their elimination from organelle genomes. In evolutionary timescales, the continuous entry of organelle DNA into the nucleus has provided novel nuclear genes. Furthermore, Mitochondria depend on nuclear genes for essential protein production as they cannot generate all necessary proteins independently. (Note: "Nuclear and Mitochondrial Diseases | Learn Science at Scitable". www.nature.com. Retrieved 2023-10-29.)

== Evolutionary aspects ==
Nuclear genes evolve through compensatory adaptation to maintain compatibility with mitochondrial DNA (mtDNA), which has a high mutation rate. Studies suggest that deleterious mtDNA mutations can drive compensatory substitutions in interacting nuclear genes, preserving cellular respiration. This process is facilitated by strong selection and low mtDNA mutation rates, which increase the nuclear genome’s role in stabilizing organelle function. (Note: de Aguiar MA (2024-11-01). "Life with two genomes: how nuclear and mitochondrial incompatibilities?". Proceedings of the National Academy of Sciences. 121 (47). doi:10.1073/pnas.2323461110. Retrieved 2024-11-01.)

Mito-nuclear incompatibilities, such as those from mtDNA introgression, may also accelerate speciation by reducing hybrid fitness, though their impact depends on mutation rates and initial genetic mismatches. While observed in plants and some animals, (Note: Hill GE (2020). "Mitonuclear compensatory coevolution". Trends in Genetics. 36 (6): 403–414. doi:10.1016/j.tig.2020.03.002. PMID 32294476.) nuclear compensation’s ubiquity remains debated due to challenges in distinguishing it from coevolution or relaxed purifying selection.

== Endosymbiotic organelle interactions ==
Though separated from one another within the cell, nuclear genes and those of mitochondria and chloroplasts can affect each other in a number of ways. Nuclear genes play major roles in the expression of chloroplast genes and mitochondrial genes. (Note: Henri PL (2023-10-12). "Chloroplast RNA processing and stability". Photosynthesis Research. 98 (3): 301–14.) Additionally, gene products of mitochondria can themselves affect the expression of genes within the cell nucleus. (Note: Ali AT, Boehme L, Carbajosa G, Seitan VC, Small KS, Hodgkinson A (February 2019). "Nuclear genetic regulation of the human mitochondrial transcriptome". eLife. 8. doi:10.7554/eLife.41927. PMC 6420317. PMID 30775970.)

This can be done through metabolites as well as through certain peptides trans-locating from the mitochondria to the nucleus, where they can then affect gene expression. (Note: de Aguiar MA (2024-11-01). "Life with two genomes: how nuclear and mitochondrial incompatibilities?". Proceedings of the National Academy of Sciences. 121 (47). doi:10.1073/pnas.2323461110. Retrieved 2024-11-01.) (Note: King CM, Son JB, Mongodin EF (2020). "The Mitochondrial-Encoded Peptide MOTS-c Translocates to the Nucleus to Regulate Stress Responses". Cell Metabolism. 28 (3): 516–524.e7. PMID 33227564.) (Note: Mangalhara KC, Shadel GS (September 2018). "A Mitochondrial-Derived Peptide Exercises the Nuclear Option". Cell Metabolism. 28 (3): 330–331. doi:10.1016/j.cmet.2018.08.017. PMID 30184481.)

== Structure ==
Eukaryotic genomes have distinct higher-order chromatin structures that are closely packaged functional relates to gene expression. Chromatin compresses the genome to fit into the cell nucleus, while still ensuring that the gene can be accessed when needed, such as during gene transcription, replication, and DNA repair. (Note: Van Bortle K, Corces VG (2012). "Nuclear organization and genome function". Annual Review of Cell and Developmental Biology. 28: 163–187. doi:10.1146/annurev-cellbio-101011-155824. PMC 3717390. PMID 22905954.) The entirety of genome function is based on the underlying relationship between nuclear organization and the mechanisms involved in genome organization, in which there are a number of complex mechanisms and biochemical pathways which can affect the expression of individual genes within the genome. The remaining mitochondrial proteins, metabolic enzymes, DNA and RNA polymerases, ribosomal proteins, and mtDNA regulatory factors are all encoded by nuclear genes. Because nuclear genes constitute the genetic foundation of all eukaryotic organisms, anything that might change their genetic expression has a direct impact on the organism's cellular genotypes and phenotypes. The nucleus also contains a number of distinct subnuclear foci known as nuclear bodies, which are dynamically controlled structures that help numerous nuclear processes run more efficiently. Active genes, for instance, might migrate from chromosomal regions and concentrate into subnuclear foci known as transcription factories.

== Protein synthesis ==
The majority of proteins in a cell are the product of messenger RNA transcribed from nuclear genes, including most of the proteins of the organelles, which are produced in the cytoplasm like all nuclear gene products and then transported to the organelle. Genes in the nucleus are arranged in a linear fashion upon chromosomes, which serve as the scaffold for replication and the regulation of gene expression. As such, they are usually under strict copy-number control, and replicate a single time per cell cycle. (Note: Griffiths, Anthony J. F., Gelbart WM, Miller JH, Lewontin RC (1999). "DNA Replication". In Modern Genetic Analysis. New York: W. H. Freeman.)

Nuclear cells such as platelets do not possess nuclear DNA and therefore must have alternative sources for the RNA that they need to generate proteins. With the nuclear genome's 3.3 billion DNA base pairs in humans, one good example of a nuclear gene is MDH1 or the malate dehydrogenase 1 gene. In various metabolic pathways, including the citric acid cycle, MDH1 is a protein-coding gene that encodes an enzyme that catalyzes the NAD/NADH-dependent, reversible oxidation of malate to oxaloacetate. This gene codes for the cytosolic isozyme, which is involved in the malate-aspartate shuttle, which allows malate to cross past the mitochondrial membrane and be converted to oxaloacetate to perform further cellular functions. (Note: McAlister-Henn L, Small W C (1997). "Molecular Genetics of Yeast TCA Cycle Isozymes". Progress in Nucleic Acid Research and Molecular Biology. vol. 57: 317–339. Elsevier. doi:10.1016/S0079-6603(08)60285-8. ISBN 978-0-12-540057-2. PMID 9175438.) This gene among many exhibits its huge purposeful role in the entirety of an organism’s physiologic function. Although non-nuclear genes may exist in its functional nature, the role of nuclear genes in response and in coordination with non-nuclear genes is fundamental.

== Comparison with organellar genes ==
Nuclear genes differ significantly from organellar genes (those located in mitochondria and chloroplasts) in their organization, inheritance, and function. These differences stem from their distinct evolutionary origins and cellular roles.

=== Genome structure ===
- Nuclear genes:
  - Located on linear chromosomes within the cell nucleus
  - Packaged with histone proteins into chromatin
  - Typically contain introns and complex regulatory sequences
  - Genome size ranges from ~3,000 genes (microsporidia) to ~40,000 (some plants)
- Organellar genes:
  - Found on circular DNA molecules (similar to bacterial plasmids)
  - Lack histone packaging
  - Generally have fewer introns and simpler regulatory regions
  - Small genomes (human mtDNA has 37 genes, chloroplasts ~100-200) (Note: Gray MW (2021-12-18). "Mitochondrial Evolution". Cold Spring Harbor Perspectives in Biology. 4 (8): a011403.)

=== Inheritance patterns ===
Nuclear genes	Organellar genes
Mendelian inheritance (both parents contribute equally)	Cytoplasmic inheritance (typically maternal)
Recombination occurs during meiosis	Little to no recombination
Follow Hardy-Weinberg principle population genetics	Show population bottleneck effects (Note: Griffiths AJ (2020). "Non-Mendelian Inheritance". In Introduction to Genetic Analysis (12th ed.). W.H. Freeman. ISBN 978-1-319-20854-7.)

=== Gene function ===
While nuclear genes encode most cellular proteins, organellar genomes are specialized for:

- Mitochondrial genes: Oxidative phosphorylation components, tRNA/rRNA
- Chloroplast genes: Photosynthesis machinery, transcription/translation apparatus (Note: Race HL (1999). "Why Have Organelles Retained Genomes?". Trends in Genetics. 15 (9): 364–370. doi:10.1016/S0168-9525(99)01766-7. PMID 10461205.)

Notably, >90% of mitochondrial proteins and >95% of chloroplast proteins are actually nuclear-encoded, then imported into the organelles. (Note: Neupert W (2007). "Protein Import into Mitochondria". Annual Review of Biochemistry. 76: 723–749. doi:10.1146/annurev.biochem.76.052705.163409. PMID 17263664.)

=== Evolutionary aspects ===
The endosymbiotic theory explains these differences:

- Mitochondria and chloroplasts evolved from free-living bacteria
- Most ancestral bacterial genes were either lost or transferred to the nucleus
- Remaining organellar genes are typically for: (Note: Archibald JM (2015). "Endosymbiosis and Eukaryotic Cell Evolution". Current Biology. 25 (19): R911–R921. Bibcode:2015CBio...25.R911A. doi:10.1016/j.cub.2015.07.055. PMID 26439354.)
  - Time-critical functions (e.g., rapid response to energy needs)
  - Hydrophobic membrane proteins hard to import
  - Core translation machinery

== Significance ==
Many nuclear-derived transcription factors have played a role in respiratory chain expression. These factors may have also contributed to the regulation of mitochondrial functions. Nuclear respiratory factor (NRF-1) fuses to respiratory encoding genes proteins, to the rate-limiting enzyme in biosynthesis, and to elements of replication and transcription of mitochondrial DNA, or mtDNA. The second nuclear respiratory factor (NRF-2) is necessary for the production of cytochrome c oxidase subunit IV (COXIV) and Vb (COXVb) to be maximized.

The studying of gene sequences for the purpose of speciation and determining genetic similarity is just one of the many uses of modern day genetics, and the role that both types of genes have in that process is important. Though both nuclear genes and those within endosymbiotic organelles provide the genetic makeup of an organism, there are distinct features that can be better observed when looking at one compared to the other. Mitochondrial DNA is useful in the study of speciation as it tends to be the first to evolve in the development of a new species, which is different from nuclear genes' chromosomes that can be examined and analyzed individually, each giving its own potential answer as to the speciation of a relatively recently evolved organism. (Note: Moore WS (1995). "Inferring Phylogenies from mtDNA Variation: Mitochondrial-Gene Trees Versus Nuclear-Gene Trees". Evolution. 49 (4): 718–726. doi:10.2307/2410325. JSTOR 2410325. PMID 28565131.)

Low-copy nuclear genes in plants are valuable for improving phylogenetic reconstructions, especially when universal markers like Chloroplast DNA, or cpDNA and Nuclear ribosomal DNA, or nrDNA fall short. Challenges in using these genes include limited universal markers and the complexity of gene families. Nonetheless, they are essential for resolving close species relationships and understanding plant phylogenetic studies. While using low-copy nuclear genes requires additional lab work, advances in sequencing and cloning techniques have made it more accessible. Fast-evolving introns in these genes can offer crucial phylogenetic insights near species boundaries. This approach, along with the analysis of developmentally important genes, enhances the study of plant diversity and evolution. (Note: Sang Y (2023). "Unraveling nuclear-cytoplasmic separation in plant mitochondria". Critical Reviews in Biochemistry and Molecular Biology. 58 (2): 121–147. doi:10.1080/nature.202309027. Retrieved 2023-08-18.)

As nuclear genes are the genetic basis of all eukaryotic organisms, anything that can affect their expression therefore directly affects characteristics about that organism on a cellular level. The interactions between the genes of endosymbiotic organelles like mitochondria and chloroplasts are just a few of the many factors that can act on the nuclear genome.

== See also ==
- Carl Woese
- Lynn Margulis
- Eukaryote
- Endosymbiont
