= Maturase K =

Plant plastidial gene

Identifiers
- Organism: Arabidopsis thaliana, plants
- Symbol: matK
- Alt. symbols: ycf14
- Entrez: 844797
- RefSeq (mRNA): NP_051040.2
- UniProt: P56784
Search for
- Structures: Swiss-model
- Domains: InterPro

MatK/TrnK, N-terminal (inactive RT)

Identifiers
- Symbol: MatK_N
- Pfam: PF01824
- InterPro: IPR024942
Available protein structures:
- Pfam: structures / ECOD
- PDB: RCSB PDB; PDBe; PDBj
- PDBsum: structure summary

Location of the matK gene in the chloroplast genome of Arabidopsis thaliana. matK is one of the protein-coding genes involved in functions other than photosynthetic reactions (red boxes). matK maps at the 2–3.5 kb coordinates.

Maturase K (matK) is a plant plastidial gene. The protein it encodes is an organelle intron maturase, a protein that splices Group II introns. It is essential for in vivo splicing of Group II introns. Amongst other maturases, this protein retains only a well conserved domain X and remnants of a reverse transcriptase domain.

Universal matK primers can be used for DNA barcoding of angiosperms.

== See also ==
- LtrA, an open reading frame found in the Lactococcus lactis group II introns LtrB. It is an intron-encoded protein, with three subdomains, one of which is a reverse-transcriptase/maturase.
