= Cuban pine forests =

Coordinates: 23.13°N 82.383°W

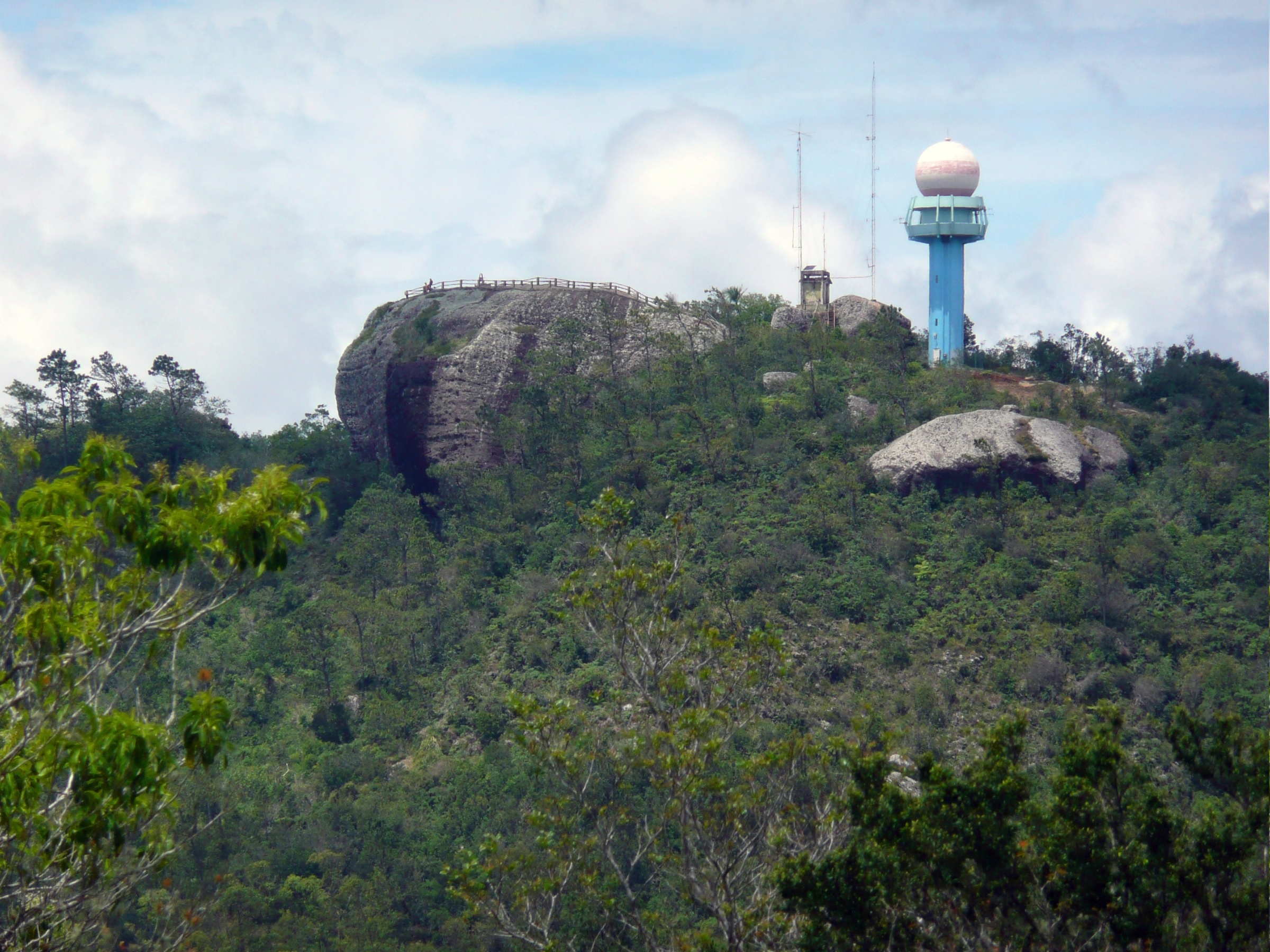
- Gran Piedra, Sierra Maestra

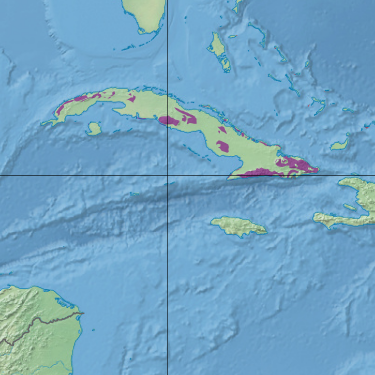
- Ecoregion territory (in purple)

Ecology
- Realm: Neotropical
- Biome: Tropical and subtropical coniferous forests
- Bird species: 249
- Mammal species: 34

Geography
- Area: 6,400 km^{2} (2,500 sq mi)
- Country: Cuba

Conservation
- Conservation status: Critical/endangered
- Habitat loss: 52.883%
- Protected: 7.66%

The Cuban pine forests are a tropical coniferous forest ecoregion on the Caribbean islands of Cuba and Isla de la Juventud. They cover an area of 6,400 km^{2} (2,500 sq mi), occurring in separate sections in eastern Cuba and western Cuba and Isla de la Juventud.

== Description ==
Pine forests are found primarily in well-drained, nutrient-poor, acidic soils such as quartziferous sands, pseudo-spodosols in the west, and lateritic soils. Pine trees and encino (Quercus sagraeana) obtain nutrients through an ectomycorrhizal symbiosis with fungi, allowing them to attain tree size. The forests feature a dense xerophytic brushy story of mainly Rubiaceae, Euphorbiaceae, Myrtaceae, and Melastomataceae along with a herbaceous story of a few epiphytes, primarily from the genus Tillandsia, and lianas. Secondary forests formed by deforestation have a more open canopy with an understory dominated by Comocladia dentata; grasses, lianas and epiphytes are poorly represented.

== Western pine forests ==
Western pine forests are found in the northern and southern plains surrounding the Sierra de los Órganos in Pinar del Río Province and on the northern half of Isla de la Juventud. Annual precipitation is less than 1,500 mm (59 in), with a dry season from November to April and a rainy season from May to October. The temperature ranges from 21.5 to 28 °C (70.7 to 82.4 °F), averaging 25 °C (77 °F), and is somewhat less at higher elevations. Pino macho (Pinus caribaea var. caribaea), which may reach heights of up to 30 m (98 ft), and pino hembra (Pinus tropicalis) dominate the canopy. Other species such include peralejo (Byrsonima crassifolia), palma barrigona (Colpothrinax wrightii), icaco (Chrysobalanus icaco var. hellocarpus), encino (Quercus sagraeana), Calophyllum pinetorum, Erythroxylum minutifolium, Phania cajalbanica, Vaccinium cubense, Hyperbaena columbica, Clusia rosea, Copernicia species, yuraguano (Coccothrinax yuraguana), Aristida species and Andropogon species. Ferritic soils in Pinar del Río, such as in the Cajálbana plateau, are home to Pinus caribaea var. caribaea and an understory rich in endemic species. Mixed pine forests develop over oligotrophic quartzitic yellow soils in northern Pinar del Río province and Isla de la Juventud. They feature Pinus caribaea var. caribaea, P. tropicalis, and, possibly, Quercus sagraeana. Dry, rocky pine forests found on the southern side of the Cajálbana plateau include pines, thorny scrublands, and Agave cajalbanensis, an endemic succulent.

== Eastern pine forests ==
Small patches of pine forest occur around the Sierra Cristal, Nipe-Sagua-Baracoa Mountains, and Sierra Maestra. These forests are found at higher elevations than western pine forests, up to 800–1,800 m (2,600–5,900 ft), making them cooler and wetter. Consequently, some of the vegetation resembles that of the rainforests, with an abundance of ferns. Pino de la Maestra (Pinus maestrensis) predominates in the Sierra Maestra, developing on landslide areas over granitic rock, while the Pino de Mayarí (Pinus cubensis) predominates in the Nipe-Sagua-Baracoa. Some accompanying species in these forests are the griñapo (Dracaena cubensis), Eupatorium spp., Myrtus spp., Baccharis spp., Jacaranda arborea and Eugenia pinetorum.

== Fauna ==
Endemic birds include the olive-capped warbler (Dendroica pityophila), Cuban kite (Chondrohierax wilsonii), Cuban trogon (Priotelus temnurus), Cuban amazon, (Amazona leucocephala) and Cuban tody (Todus multicolor). The Cuban ivory-billed woodpecker (Campephilus principalis bairdii) may remain in eastern pine forests, but is probably extinct.
