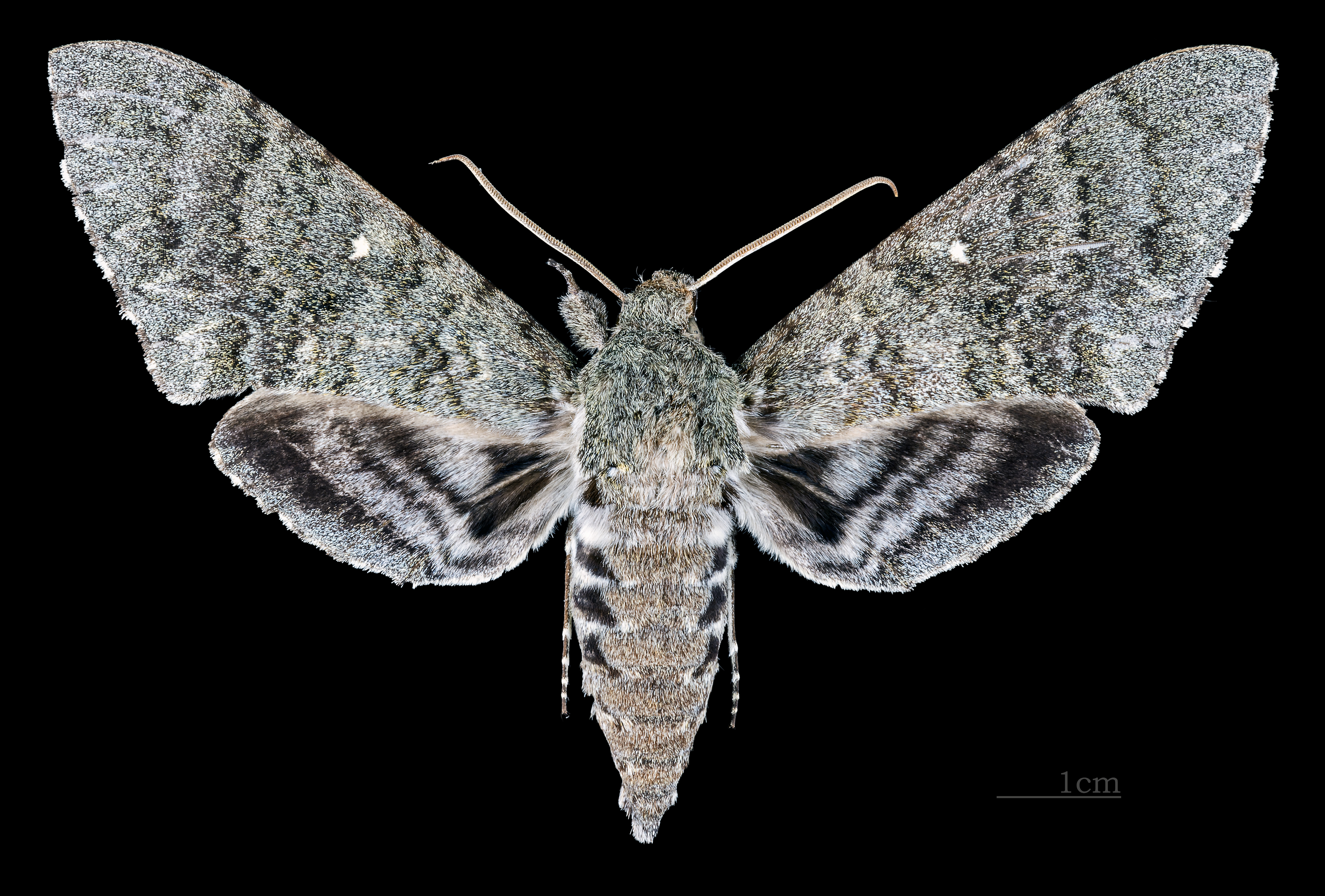
- Manduca muscosa, dorsal
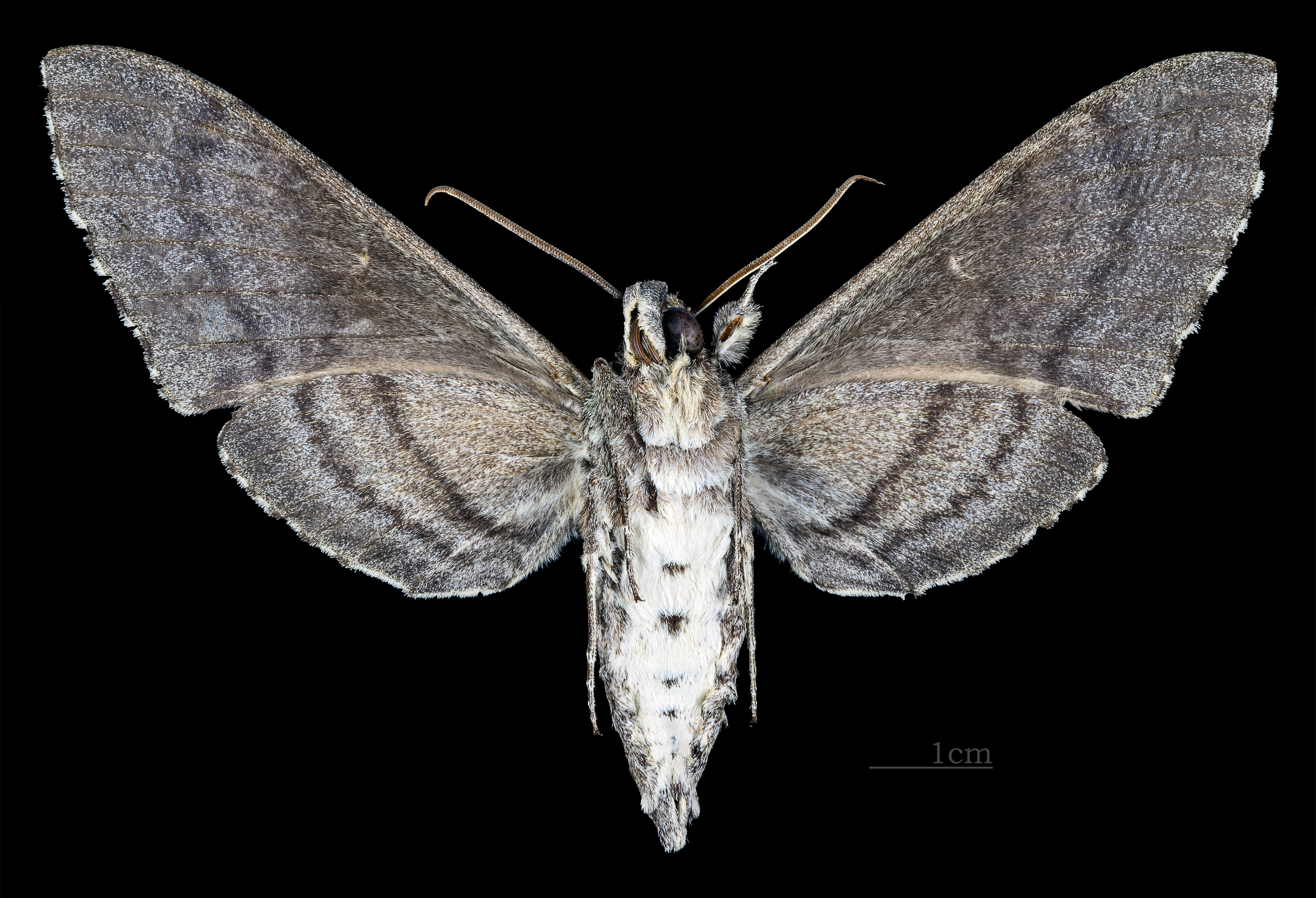
- Manduca muscosa, ventral

Conservation status
- Apparently Secure (NatureServe)

Scientific classification
- Kingdom: Animalia
- Phylum: Arthropoda
- Class: Insecta
- Order: Lepidoptera
- Family: Sphingidae
- Genus: Manduca
- Species: M. muscosa

Binomial name
- Manduca muscosa (Rothschild & Jordan, 1903)

Synonyms
- Protoparce muscosa Rothschild & Jordan, 1903

= Manduca muscosa =

Muscosa sphinx

Species of moth

Manduca muscosa, the muscosa sphinx, is a moth of the family Sphingidae.

== Distribution ==
It is found from southern and western Arizona in tropical and subtropical lowlands and premontane forests and oak woodland, then south through Mexico, Belize, Guatemala, Nicaragua and Costa Rica.

== Description ==
The wingspan is 100–126 mm. It is similar to Manduca sesquiplex but the forewing is much less elongate, the ground colour of the body and wings is darker, almost olive and the pale bands on the hindwing are less prominent.

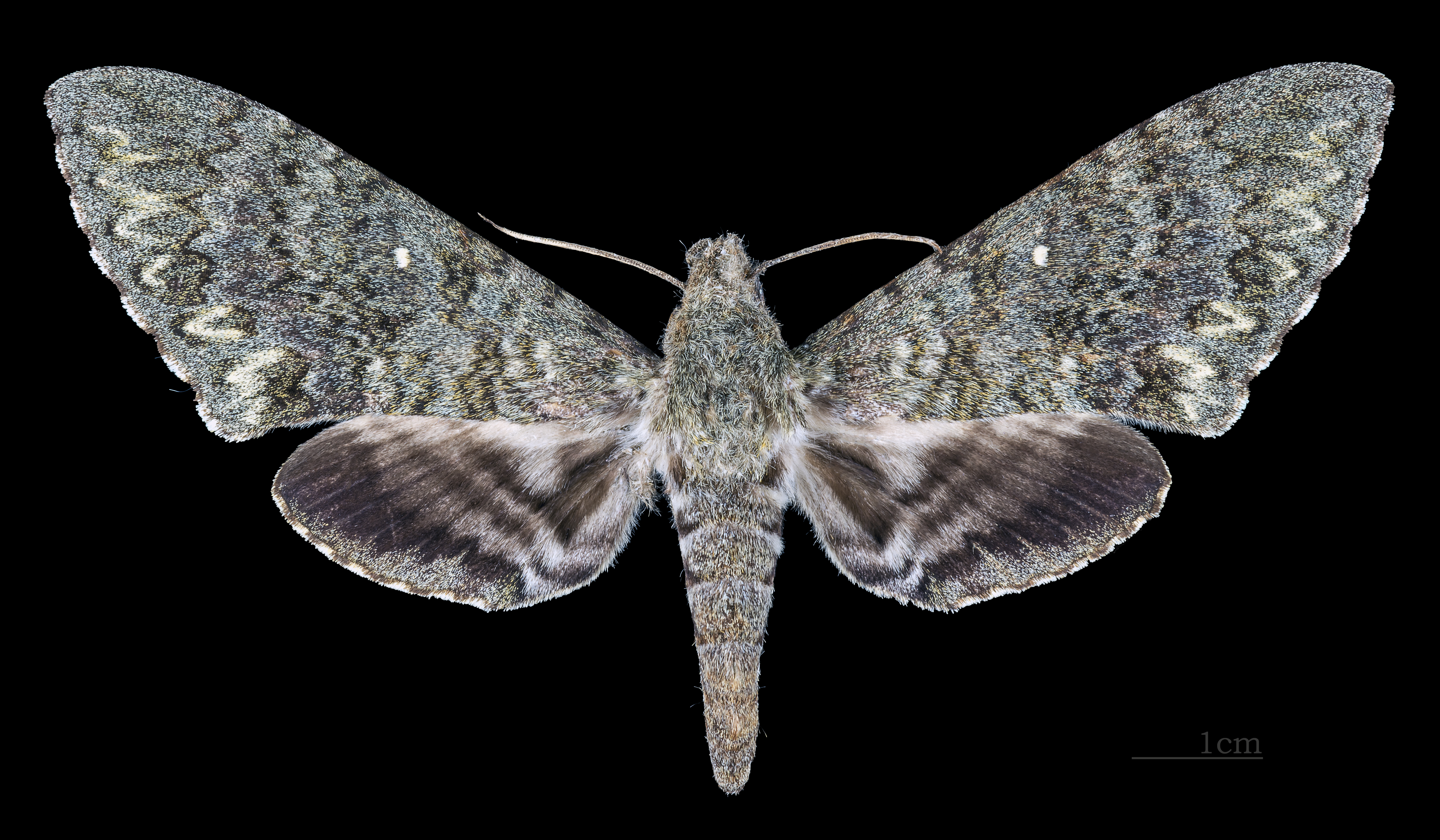
Female Dorsale

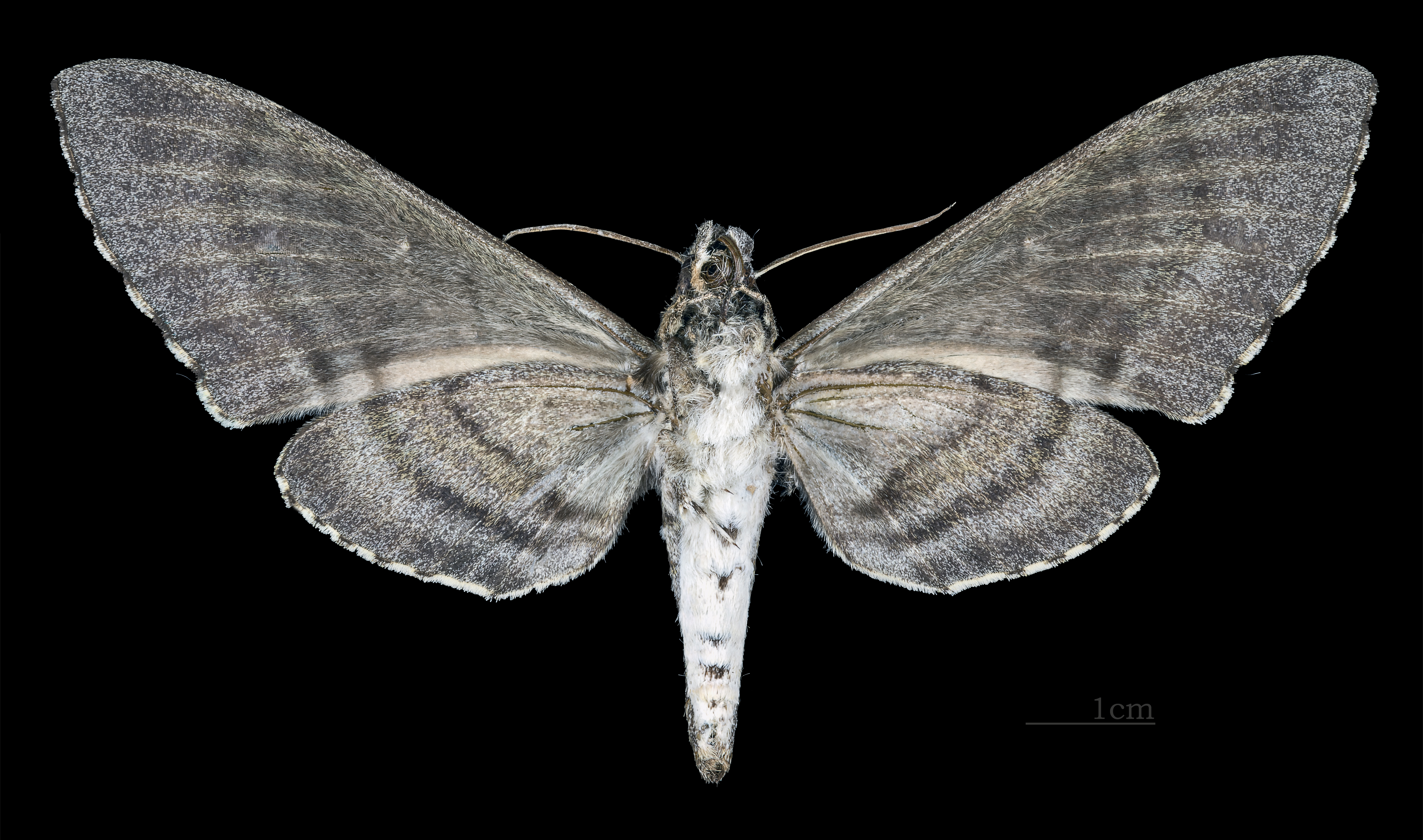
Female ventral

== Biology ==
There is one generation per year with adults on wing from mid-July to early August in southern Arizona. In Costa Rica, adults are on wing from May to November.

The larvae feed on Verbesina gigantea, Lasianthaea fruticosa, Eupatorium albicaule, Viguiera dentate, Eupatorium albicaule, Lantana camara, sunflower and Jacaranda caroba.
