= Caroba =

- Village
- Location of Areia Branca in Sergipe

- Location within Brazil
- Coordinates: 10°49′49″S 37°22′30″W
- Country: Brazil
- State: Sergipe
- Municipality: Areia Branca
- Elevation: 185 m (607 ft)
- Population (2022): 287

Caroba (Brazilian Portuguese pronunciation: [kaˈɾɔbɐ]) is a village in the municipality of Areia Branca, state of Sergipe, in northeastern Brazil. As of 2022 it had a population of 287. It is named after the jacaranda caroba plant.

== See also ==
- List of villages in Sergipe
