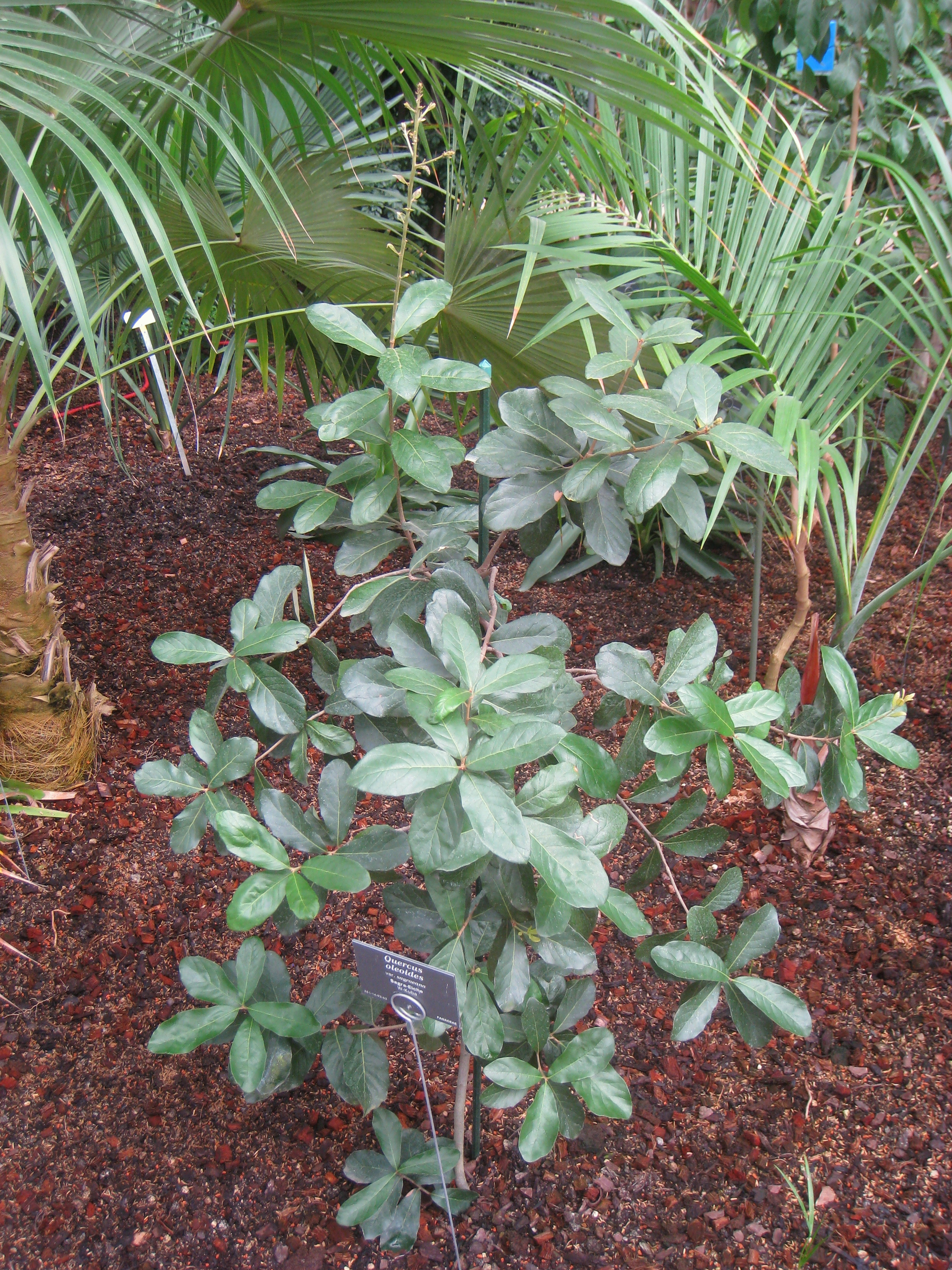

Conservation status
- Endangered (IUCN 3.1)

Scientific classification
- Kingdom: Plantae
- Clade: Embryophytes
- Clade: Tracheophytes
- Clade: Spermatophytes
- Clade: Angiosperms
- Clade: Eudicots
- Clade: Rosids
- Order: Fagales
- Family: Fagaceae
- Genus: Quercus
- Subgenus: Quercus subg. Quercus
- Section: Quercus sect. Virentes
- Species: Q. sagraeana

Binomial name
- Quercus sagraeana Nutt.

Synonyms
- Quercus cubana A.Rich.; Quercus oleoides subsp. sagraeana (Nutt.) Borhidi; Quercus oleoides var. sagraeana (Nutt.) C.H.Mull.; Quercus virginiana var. sagraeana (Nutt.) Trel.

= Quercus sagraeana =

Cuban oak

Species of oak tree

Quercus sagraeana, also spelled Quercus sagrana, the Cuban oak, is a medium-sized evergreen tree native to western Cuba in the Cuban pine forests ecoregion. It is the only oak native to the Caribbean.

It is known in Cuban Spanish as encina del sur.

== Taxonomy ==
The Cuban oak was first described by Nuttall in 1842 as Quercus sagraeana based on the specimen collected by Ramón de la Sagra. Article 60.8(c) of the International Code of Nomenclature for algae, fungi, and plants provides that where personal names end in -a, the adjectival form of the specific epithet is formed by adding -n- plus the appropriate gender ending. However according to the International Plant Names Index "the epithet is an intentional latinization of the name Sagra (Sagraeanus) and is not correctable."

Using the same specimen, but apparently unaware of the original name, Richard (1853) named the Cuban oak Q. cubana. Trelease (1924) did not view Q. sagrana as a species in its own right but as a variety of Q. virginiana. He proposed the name Q. virginiana var. sagrana. Muller (1961) renamed it Q. oleoides var. sagrana, hypothesizing that the Cuban oak population was a subspecies of Q. oleoides, originating from the Yucatán region of Mexico, but with introgression from Q. geminata coming from Florida. He considered the morphologically variable Cuban population a hybrid swarm that had stabilized and was distinct from the other live oaks of the Virentes. A recent study of molecular genetic variation and taxonomically informative leaf morphology shows that the Cuban oak shows little evidence of hybrid origin and is most similar to Q. virginiana, but distinct enough to be regarded as a separate species, Q. sagrana. It is placed in section Virentes.

== Conservation ==
The species is considered Endangered by the IUCN Red List, due to habitat destruction and fragmentation of Cuban pine forests by mining, cattle grazing, urban development and fires in its endemic Pinar del Río Province.

== See also ==
- Cuban pine forests
