= Palaeoraphe =

Palaeoraphe Temporal range: Burdigalian

Scientific classification
- Kingdom: Plantae
- Clade: Tracheophytes
- Clade: Angiosperms
- Clade: Monocots
- Clade: Commelinids
- Order: Arecales
- Family: Arecaceae
- Subfamily: Coryphoideae
- Tribe: Trachycarpeae
- Subtribe: Livistoninae
- Genus: †Palaeoraphe; Poinar, 2002
- Species: †P. dominicana

Binomial name
- †Palaeoraphe dominicana Poinar, 2002

Extinct genus of palms

Palaeoraphe is an extinct genus of palms, represented by one species, Palaeoraphe dominicana from early Miocene Burdigalian stage Dominican amber deposits on the island of Hispaniola, in the modern-day Dominican Republic.

== Discovery and naming ==
The genus is known from a single, 10.8 millimetres (0.43 in) diameter, full flower. The holotype is currently deposited in the collections of the Oregon State University in Corvallis, Oregon, as number "Sd–9–158", where it was studied and described by Dr George Poinar. Dr Poinar published his 2002 type description for Palaeoraphe in the Botanical Journal of the Linnean Society volume number 139. The genus name is a combination of the Greek word palaios meaning "ancient" and Raphia a genus of palm, while the species name dominicana references the Dominican Republic, where the fossil was discovered. The type specimen was excavated from the La Toca mine northeast of Santiago de los Caballeros.

== Taxonomy ==
Palaeoraphe has been placed in the Corypheae subtribe Livistoninae, which has twelve modern genera found in both the Old World and the New World. Of the three modern genera, the Palaeoraphe flower is similar in character to Brahea, Acoelorraphe and Colpothrinax, with the structure being closest in structure to that of Brahea. Both genera have distinct sepals, petals with furrows facing the axis of the flower, and similarly shaped and sized anthers. However, the two genera can be differentiated by the stigmas, which are united for their entire length in Brahea, and by the more relaxed positioning of the anthers in Palaeoraphe. The flower of P. dominicana is a calyx of three broad sepals with irregular to fringed apices. The three petals are joined at their bases and of the six stamins, those paired with petals are relaxed into depressions on the petal surface, while the remaining three stamins are partially erect.

It is proposed by Dr. Poinar that Palaeoraphe may have been a stenotopic genus which was restricted to the Greater Antilles and possibly to just the island of Hispaniola. The extinction of Palaeoraphe may have been caused by floral and faunal shifts during the Pliocene and Pleistocene.
