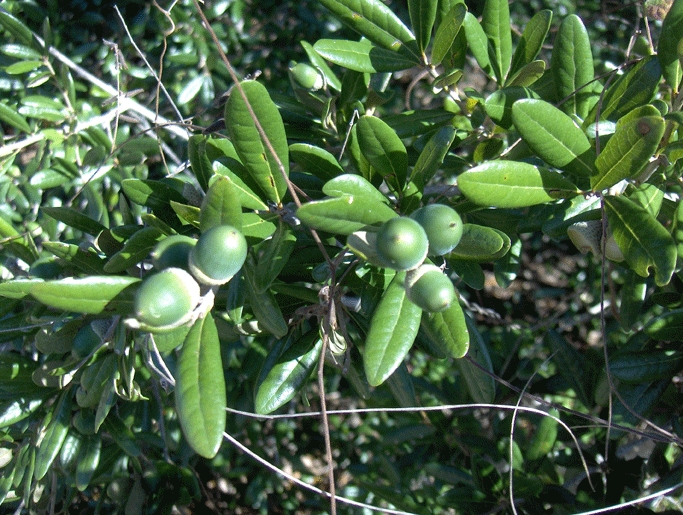
- Acorns and leaves of a sand live oak in Florida

Conservation status
- Least Concern (IUCN 3.1)

Scientific classification
- Kingdom: Plantae
- Clade: Embryophytes
- Clade: Tracheophytes
- Clade: Spermatophytes
- Clade: Angiosperms
- Clade: Eudicots
- Clade: Rosids
- Order: Fagales
- Family: Fagaceae
- Genus: Quercus
- Subgenus: Quercus subg. Quercus
- Section: Quercus sect. Virentes
- Species: Q. geminata

Binomial name
- Quercus geminata Small

Synonyms
- List: Quercus virginiana var. maritima Sarg.Michx.; Quercus geminata var. grandifolia (Sarg.) Trel.; Quercus geminata var. reasoneri A.Camus; Quercus virginiana var. geminata (Small) Sarg.; Quercus virginiana f. grandifolia Sarg.

= Quercus geminata =

Sand live oak

Species of oak tree

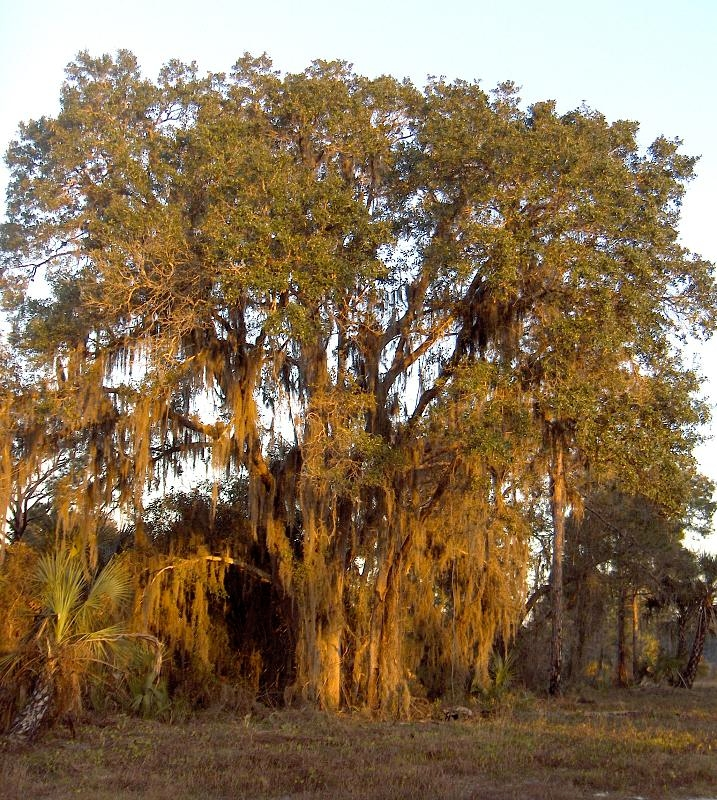
Sand live oak at sunrise

Quercus geminata, commonly called sand live oak, is an evergreen oak tree native to the coastal regions of the subtropical southeastern United States, along the Atlantic Coast from southern Florida northward to southeastern Virginia and along the Gulf Coast westward to southern Mississippi, on seacoast dunes and on white sands in evergreen oak scrubs.

== Taxonomy ==
Quercus geminata is placed in the southern live oaks section of the genus Quercus (section Virentes).

== Appearance ==
A small- to medium-sized tree, the sand live oak is scrubby and forms thickets. The bark is dark, thick, furrowed, and roughly ridged. The leaves are thick, leathery, and coarsely veined, with extremely revolute margins, giving them the appearance of inverted shallow bowls; their tops dark green, their bottoms dull gray and very tightly tomentose, and their petioles densely pubescent, they are simple and typically flat with bony-opaque margins, having a length of 2–12 centimetres (3/4–4 3/4 inches) and a width of 0.5–4 cm (1/4–1 1/2 in). The male flowers are green hanging catkins. The acorns are small, 1–2.5 cm, oblong-ellipsoid or ovoid, and are commonly born in pairs on peduncles of varying lengths.

The Florida Native Plant Society describes the plant as "Extremely drought tolerant" and a long-lived perennial.

== Description ==
In coastal Florida's evergreen oak scrub, the sand live oak is a ubiquitous and abundant species; the threatened Florida scrub-jay is found only in Florida scrub. Live oaks, having characteristics of the sand live oak and the southern live oak (Q. virginiana), grow further inland.

=== Hybrids ===
Hybridization is common among oaks, which thus creates uncertainty in the exact boundaries of species' ranges. Hybrids have been documented between Q. geminata and Q. virginiana, but the two pure species are genetically and morphologically distinct. The Cuban oak, Q. sagraeana, has been purported to be a hybrid between the sand live oak and Q. oleoides, but recent evidence argues that the Cuban oak is a distinct species without hybrid origin.
