= Dichomeris santarosensis =

Scientific classification
- Kingdom: Animalia
- Phylum: Arthropoda
- Clade: Pancrustacea
- Class: Insecta
- Order: Lepidoptera
- Family: Gelechiidae
- Genus: Dichomeris
- Species: D. santarosensis

Binomial name
- Dichomeris santarosensis Hodges, 1985

Species of moth

Dichomeris santarosensis is a moth in the family Gelechiidae. It was described by Ronald W. Hodges in 1985. It is found in Costa Rica.

The length of the forewings is 5.7–7 mm.

The larvae feed on Quercus oleoides.
