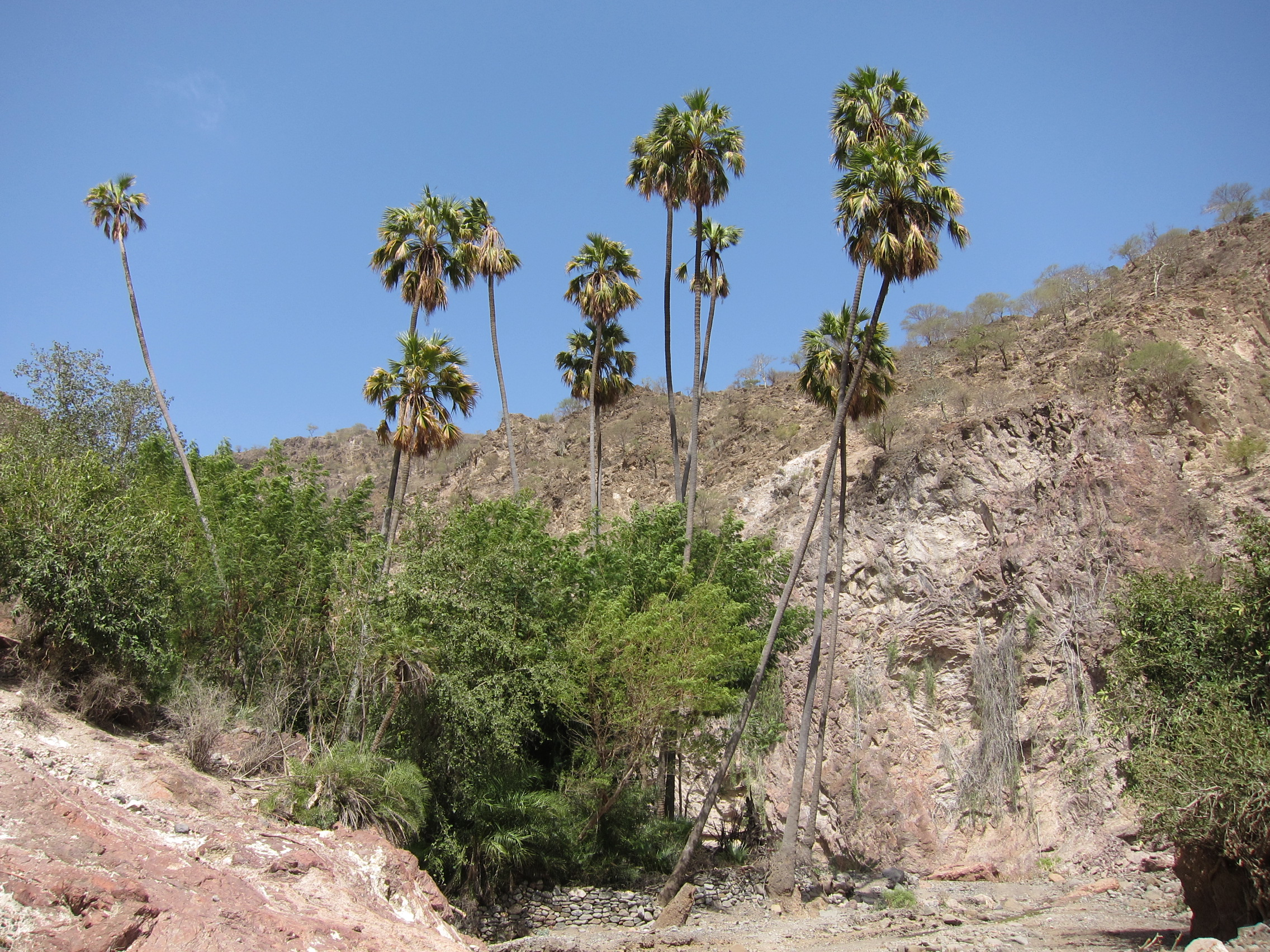
- Livistona carinensis

Scientific classification
- Kingdom: Plantae
- Clade: Tracheophytes
- Clade: Angiosperms
- Clade: Monocots
- Clade: Commelinids
- Order: Arecales
- Family: Arecaceae
- Subfamily: Coryphoideae
- Tribe: Trachycarpeae
- Subtribe: Livistoninae

= Livistoninae =

Livistoninae Temporal range: Miocene–Present

Tribe of palms

Livistoninae is a subtribe of plants in the family Arecaceae. Species in the subtribe are found throughout Indomalaya and Australasia. Genera in the subtribe are:

- Livistona – Indomalaya, Australasia, Gulf of Aden
- Licuala – Indochina, Malesia, Melanesia
- Johannesteijsmannia – Malay Peninsula and nearby parts of Sumatra and Borneo
- Pholidocarpus – Malaysia, northern Indonesia
- Saribus – Malesia, New Guinea, Island Melanesia
- Lanonia – southern China, Indochina, Java

The fossil member of this subtribe was Palaeoraphe dominicana. Palaeoraphe was known from fossil flowers at the Miocene Dominican amber.

== See also ==
- List of Arecaceae genera
- Palaeoraphe
