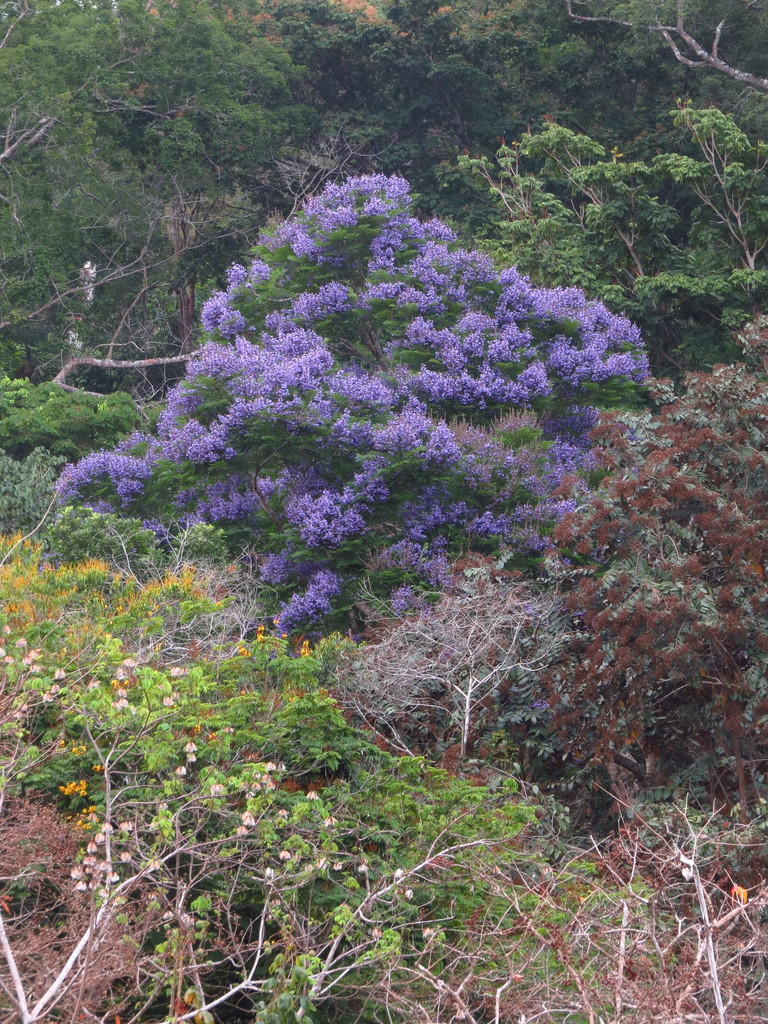

Conservation status
- Least Concern (IUCN 3.1)

Scientific classification
- Kingdom: Plantae
- Clade: Tracheophytes
- Clade: Angiosperms
- Clade: Eudicots
- Clade: Asterids
- Order: Lamiales
- Family: Bignoniaceae
- Genus: Jacaranda
- Species: J. copaia

Binomial name
- Jacaranda copaia (Aubl.) D.Don

= Jacaranda copaia =

Species of tree

Jacaranda copaia is a flowering pioneer tree belonging to the genus Jacaranda. It is native to Central America and northern South America.

== Description ==
The tree is evergreen or semi-deciduous and produces bluish purple flowers from August to November. Young trees have a long trunk with no branches. Large leaves grow directly from the top of the trunk giving them an appearance similar to tree ferns. When mature, J. copaia grows to 30 to 35 metres (98 to 115 ft) and is normally branch free for more than 50% of its height. The top consists of a "vase-shaped crown" of branches and leaves. The trunk is approximately 75 centimetres (30 in) in diameter and has rough, dark gray bark.

== Distribution ==
Jacaranda copaia is native northern South America. It is common in the Brazilian Amazon where, as a pioneer species, it colonizes gaps in the forest and areas that have been cleared. It is also native to Central America.

== Uses ==
During the dry season, the leafy branches are burned as a way to repel biting insects. The bark has been used as a laxative and to treat dysentery and syphilis. The leaves have been used to treat leishmaniasis, fevers, yaws and ringworm. The Guyana Patamona use the juice of young leaves to treat persistent sores. The native people in Kurupukari, Guyana, also use parts of the tree for treating ulcers and sores.
