= Pinus tropicalis =

Conservation status
- Vulnerable (IUCN 3.1)

Scientific classification
- Kingdom: Plantae
- Clade: Tracheophytes
- Clade: Gymnosperms
- Division: Pinophyta
- Class: Pinopsida
- Order: Pinales
- Family: Pinaceae
- Genus: Pinus
- Subgenus: P. subg. Pinus
- Section: P. sect. Pinus
- Subsection: P. subsect. Pinus
- Species: P. tropicalis

Binomial name
- Pinus tropicalis Morelet
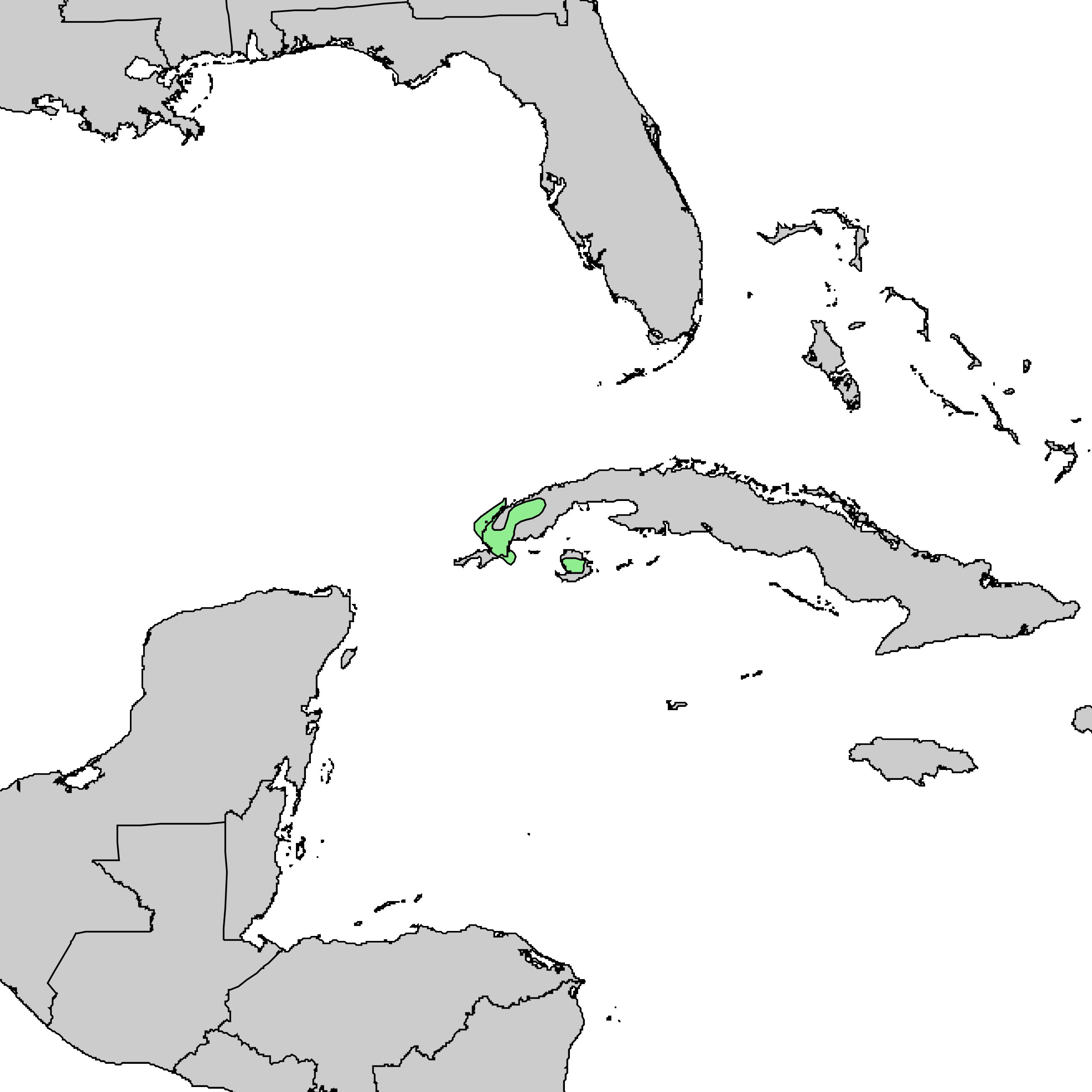
- Natural range of Pinus tropicalis

Species of pine tree

Pinus tropicalis, the tropical pine, is a species of conifer in the family Pinaceae, a pine tree endemic to the lowlands of western Cuba including the neighbouring Cuban island of Isla de la Juventud; it grows from sea level up to 150 metres altitude, rarely up to 300 m. It is a medium-sized tree with a slender trunk.

== Taxonomy ==
The tropical pine belongs to Pinus subsection Pinus, a section that, apart from Pinus resinosa, is otherwise entirely restricted to the Old World. Few genetic studies have included this rare species to date; they have confirmed its long-standing placement in this subsection, but differ in its alliances within the subsection. One placed it near-basal in the subsection, second only to the basal Pinus resinosa and sister to all the rest of the subsection. A second study placed it again second-basal, but this time with Pinus massoniana as the basal species in the subsection and P. resinosa more deeply embedded.

== Description ==
It is a medium-sized tree, growing up to 30 metres (100 feet) tall. The bark is thick, brown to grey, and deeply furrowed. The leaves ('needles') are produced in pairs, and are slender, bright green, and 20–30 cm (7.9–11.8 in) long. The cones are ovoid, 5–8 cm (2.0–3.1 in) long.

== See also ==
- Cuban pine forests
