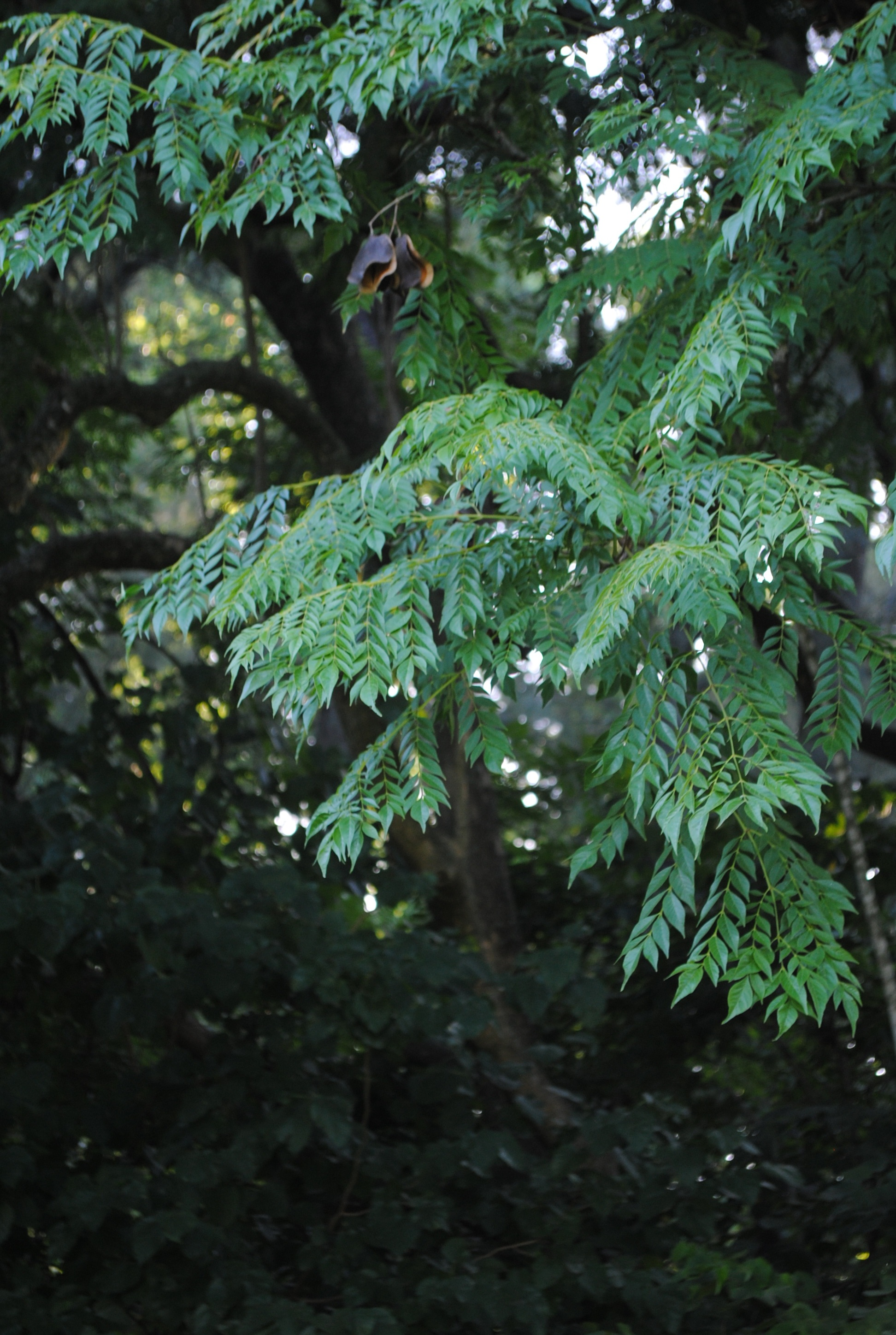

Conservation status
- Least Concern (IUCN 3.1)

Scientific classification
- Kingdom: Plantae
- Clade: Tracheophytes
- Clade: Angiosperms
- Clade: Eudicots
- Clade: Asterids
- Order: Lamiales
- Family: Bignoniaceae
- Genus: Jacaranda
- Species: J. micrantha

Binomial name
- Jacaranda micrantha Cham.

Synonyms
- Jacaranda intermedia Huber; Jacaranda intermedia Sond.

= Jacaranda micrantha =

Species of flowering plant

Jacaranda micrantha is a species of flowering plant, a tree in the family Bignoniaceae.

Jacaranda micrantha is a deciduous tree and typically grows 8 to 20 metres (26 to 66 ft) in height and 70 centimetres (28 in) in diameter. The tree is harvested from the wild as source for medicine and wood to the locals.

It is native to Argentina, Brazil, and Paraguay.
