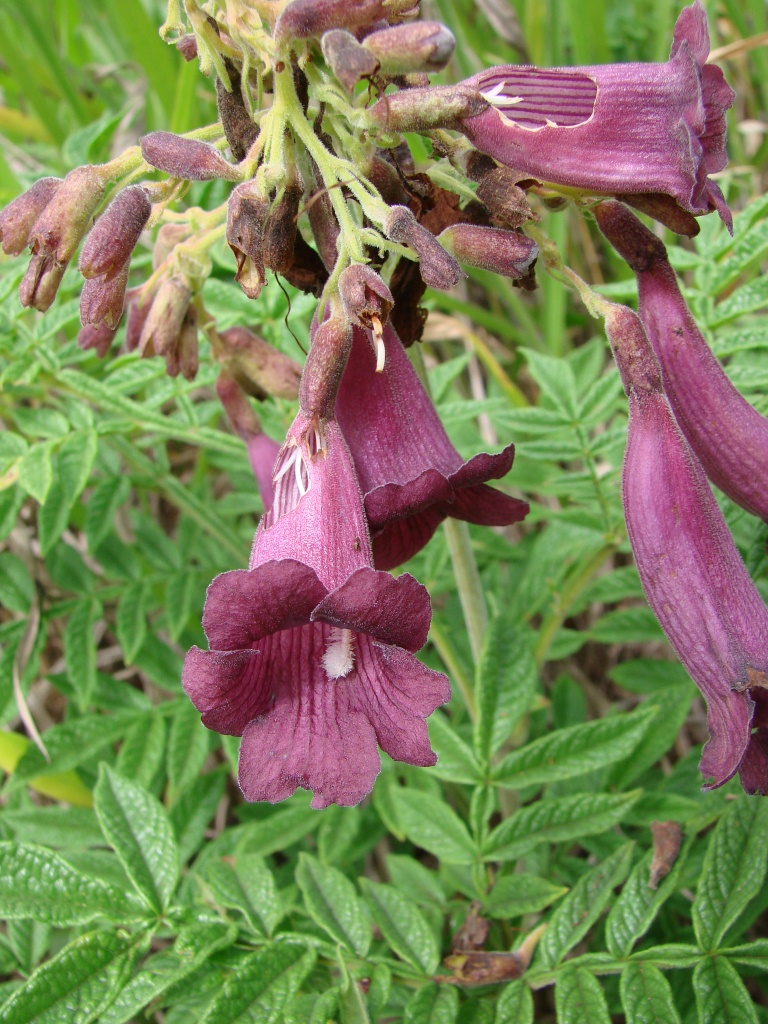

Conservation status
- Least Concern (IUCN 3.1)

Scientific classification
- Kingdom: Plantae
- Clade: Tracheophytes
- Clade: Angiosperms
- Clade: Eudicots
- Clade: Asterids
- Order: Lamiales
- Family: Bignoniaceae
- Genus: Jacaranda
- Species: J. rufa

Binomial name
- Jacaranda rufa Silva Manso

Synonyms
- Pteropodium hirsutum DC.

= Jacaranda rufa =

Species of tree

Jacaranda rufa (syn. Pteropodium hirsutum DC.) is a medicinal plant native to Bolivia and Cerrado vegetation in Brazil. This plant is cited in Flora Brasiliensis by Carl Friedrich Philipp von Martius.
