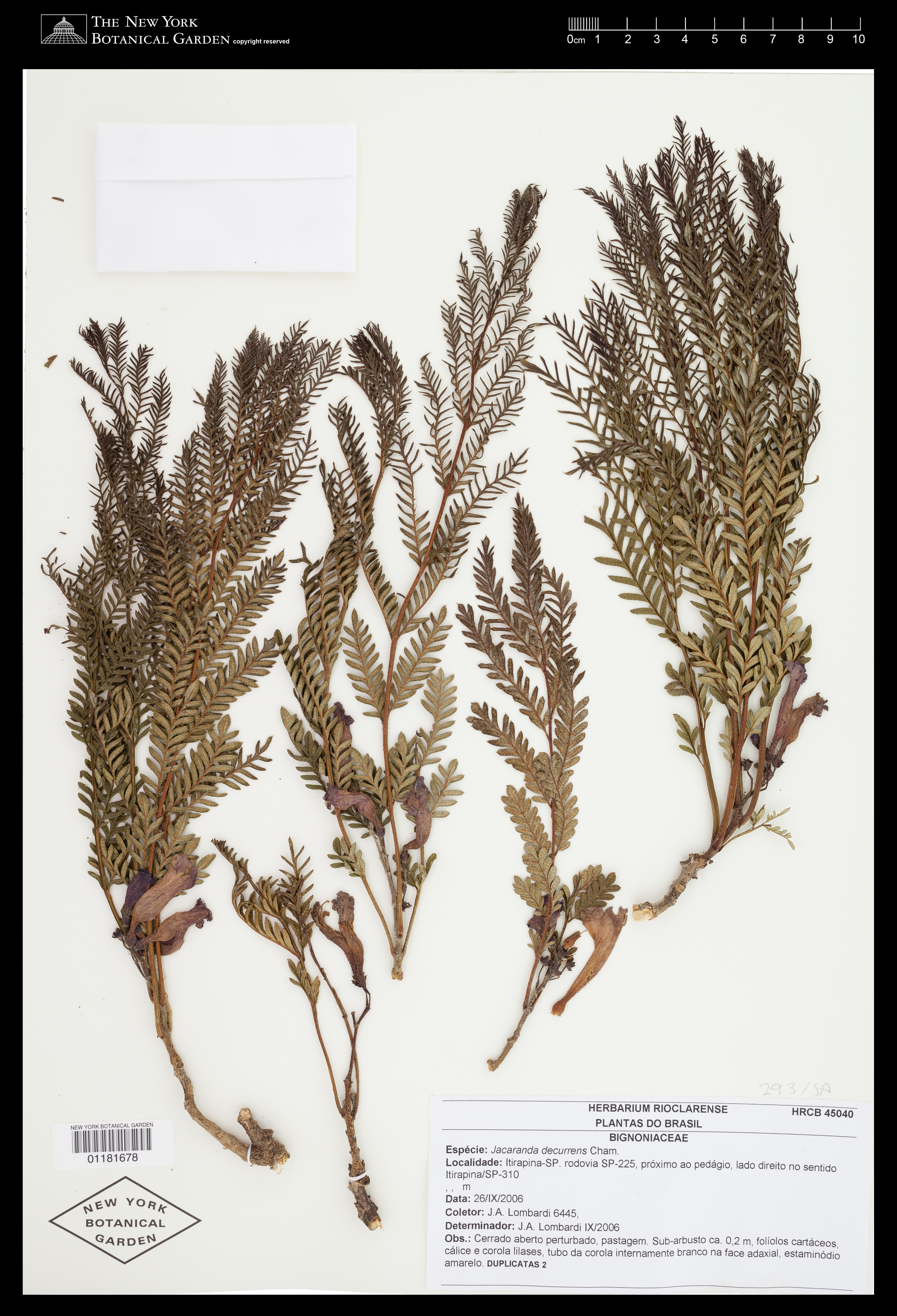

Scientific classification
- Kingdom: Plantae
- Clade: Tracheophytes
- Clade: Angiosperms
- Clade: Eudicots
- Clade: Asterids
- Order: Lamiales
- Family: Bignoniaceae
- Genus: Jacaranda
- Species: J. decurrens

Binomial name
- Jacaranda decurrens Cham.

= Jacaranda decurrens =

Species of tree

Jacaranda decurrens is a medicinal plant native to Cerrado vegetation. In Portuguese the species goes by the common name Colomba and pará parai mi.

The plant is used for gynecological infections and other conditions.

The species is native to Brazil, Paraguay, and Bolivia.
