= Pholidocarpus macrocarpus =

Conservation status
- Vulnerable (IUCN 2.3)

Scientific classification
- Kingdom: Plantae
- Clade: Tracheophytes
- Clade: Angiosperms
- Clade: Monocots
- Clade: Commelinids
- Order: Arecales
- Family: Arecaceae
- Tribe: Trachycarpeae
- Genus: Pholidocarpus
- Species: P. macrocarpus

Binomial name
- Pholidocarpus macrocarpus Becc.

Species of palm

Pholidocarpus macrocarpus is a species of flowering plant in the family Arecaceae. It is found in Peninsular Malaysia, Sumatra, and Thailand. It is threatened by habitat loss.
