= Pholidocarpus kingianus =

Conservation status
- Vulnerable (IUCN 2.3)

Scientific classification
- Kingdom: Plantae
- Clade: Tracheophytes
- Clade: Angiosperms
- Clade: Monocots
- Clade: Commelinids
- Order: Arecales
- Family: Arecaceae
- Tribe: Trachycarpeae
- Genus: Pholidocarpus
- Species: P. kingianus

Binomial name
- Pholidocarpus kingianus (Becc.) Ridley

Species of palm

Pholidocarpus kingianus is a species of flowering plant in the family Arecaceae. It is found in Peninsular Malaysia and Singapore. It is threatened by habitat destruction.
