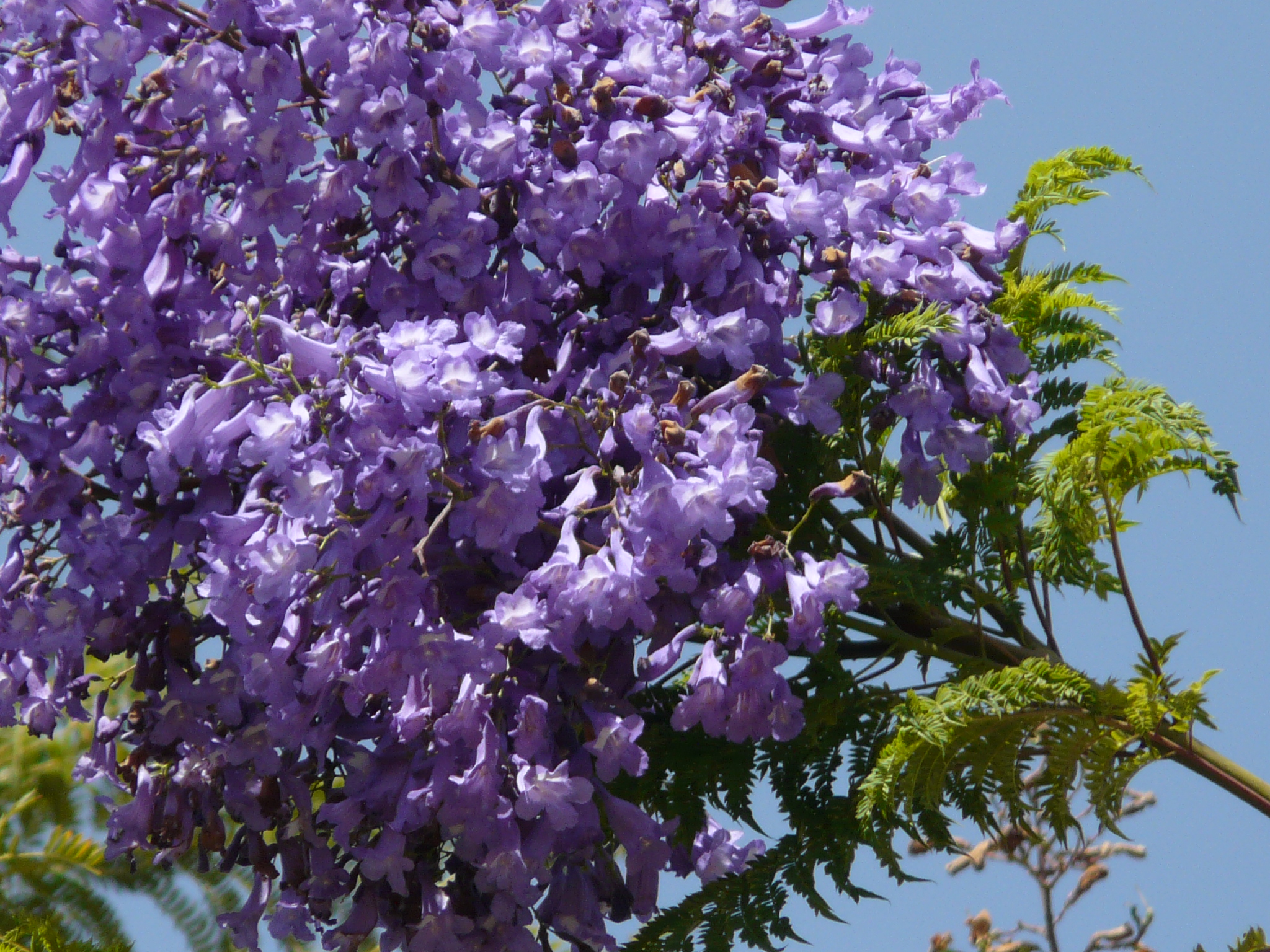
- Jacaranda obtusifolia subsp. rhombifolia

Conservation status
- Least Concern (IUCN 3.1)

Scientific classification
- Kingdom: Plantae
- Clade: Tracheophytes
- Clade: Angiosperms
- Clade: Eudicots
- Clade: Asterids
- Order: Lamiales
- Family: Bignoniaceae
- Genus: Jacaranda
- Species: J. obtusifolia

Binomial name
- Jacaranda obtusifolia Bonpl.

= Jacaranda obtusifolia =

Species of flowering plant

Jacaranda obtusifolia is a species of flowering plant in the family Bignoniaceae.
