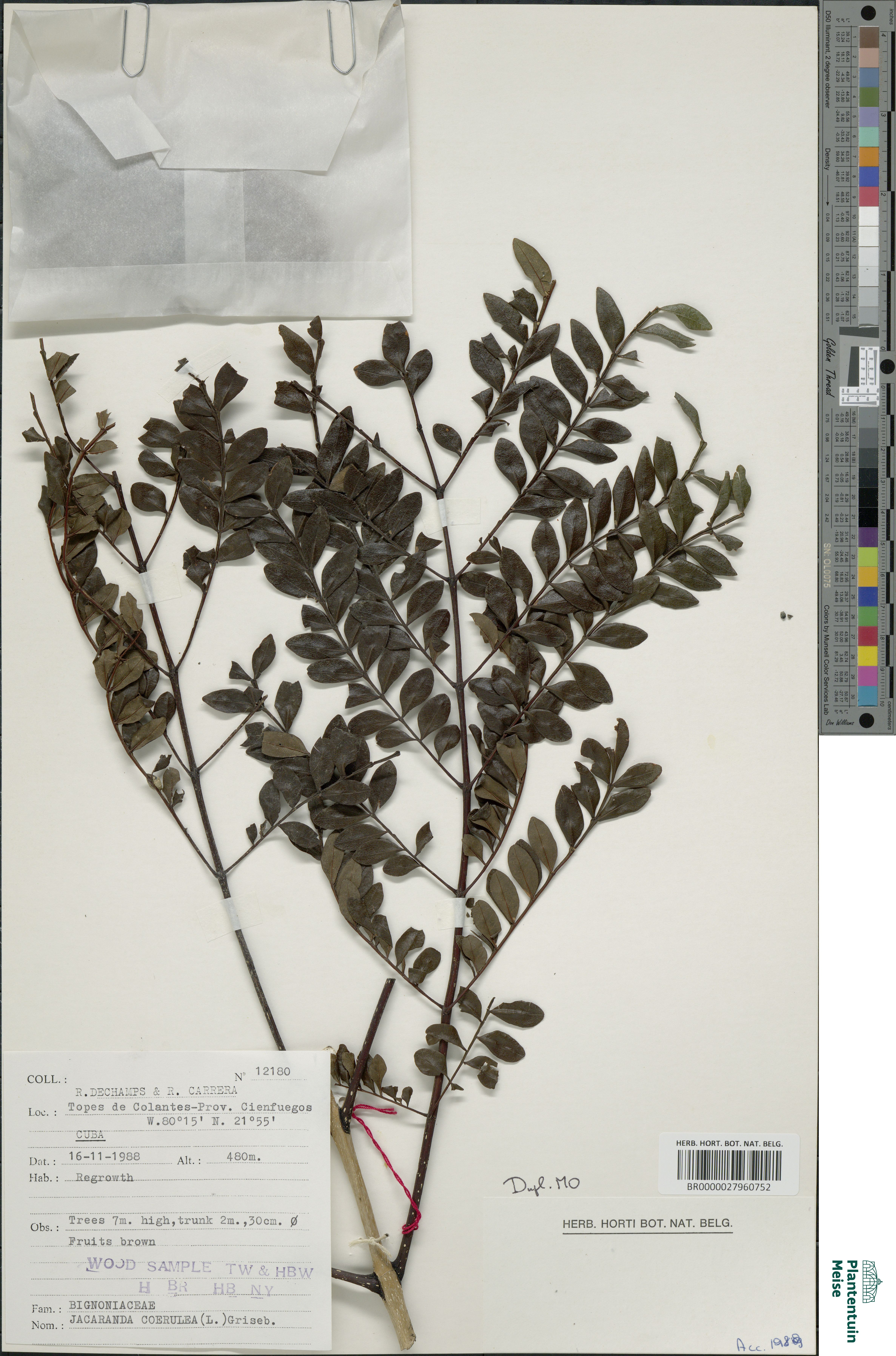

Conservation status
- Least Concern (IUCN 3.1)

Scientific classification
- Kingdom: Plantae
- Clade: Tracheophytes
- Clade: Angiosperms
- Clade: Eudicots
- Clade: Asterids
- Order: Lamiales
- Family: Bignoniaceae
- Genus: Jacaranda
- Species: J. caerulea

Binomial name
- Jacaranda caerulea (L.) J. St.-Hil.

= Jacaranda caerulea =

Species of tree

Jacaranda caerulea (boxwood or cancertree) is a flowering tree belonging to the genus Jacaranda. It is native to the West Indies, in Cuba, Hispaniola (the Dominican Republic and Haiti) and the Bahamas.

== Description ==
Jacaranda caerula was described in 1805 by French naturalist Jean Henri Jaume Saint-Hilaire. It grows up to 12 metres (39 ft) in height and has 40 cm long, bipinnate leaves each with 8 to 26 pinna.

The flowers are purplish blue in colour with a tubular shape, being narrower towards the base and larger at the tip. They measure 3.5 to 4 cm long and 1 to 1.4 cm wide at the mouth. It flowers intermittently throughout spring and summer, rather than having one big bloom during spring.

== Distribution ==
The tree is native to the Bahamas, Hispaniola, and Cuba, but can also be found in Florida where it was introduced for landscaping purposes. It most commonly found in limestone areas between sea level and 300 m (980 ft).

== Uses ==
The leaves are used in some places for their antiseptic properties. In the Bahamas, decoctions are made from the dried leaves and used as an alternative treatment for a variety of skin complaints, including skin cancer. In Cuba, decoctions of leafy branches are used to treat eczema and acne.
