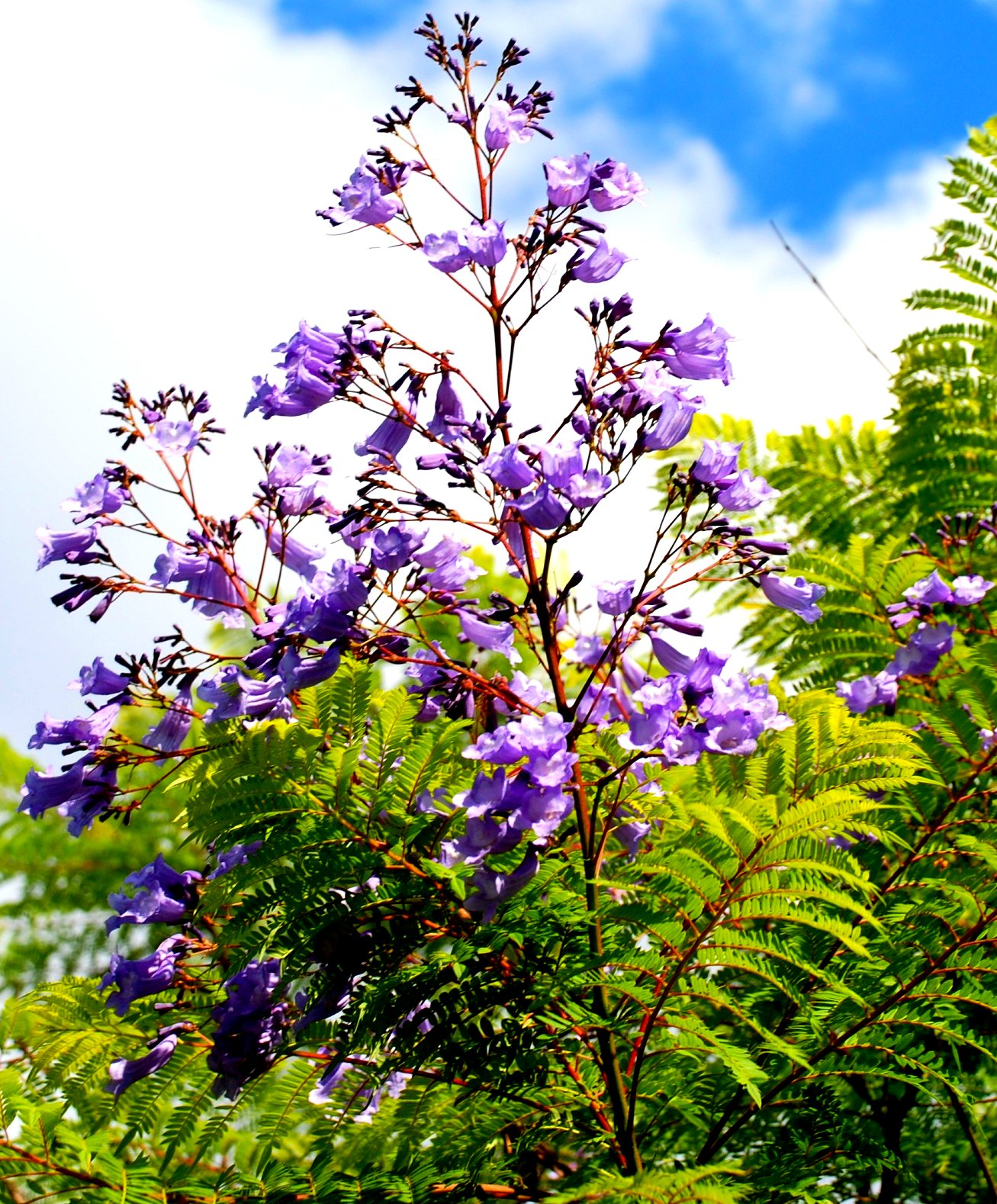

Scientific classification
- Kingdom: Plantae
- Clade: Tracheophytes
- Clade: Angiosperms
- Clade: Eudicots
- Clade: Asterids
- Order: Lamiales
- Family: Bignoniaceae
- Genus: Jacaranda
- Species: J. brasiliana

Binomial name
- Jacaranda brasiliana Pers.

Synonyms
- Bignonia brasiliana Lam.

= Jacaranda brasiliana =

Species of flowering plant

Jacaranda brasiliana is a species of flowering plant in the family Bignoniaceae. It is native to Brazil, including in the Amazon, Cerrado, and Caatinga domains—typically from Mato Grosso to Minas Gerais, and Pará to Bahia.

The flowers can be collected from November to February, with the fruit collected in February.
