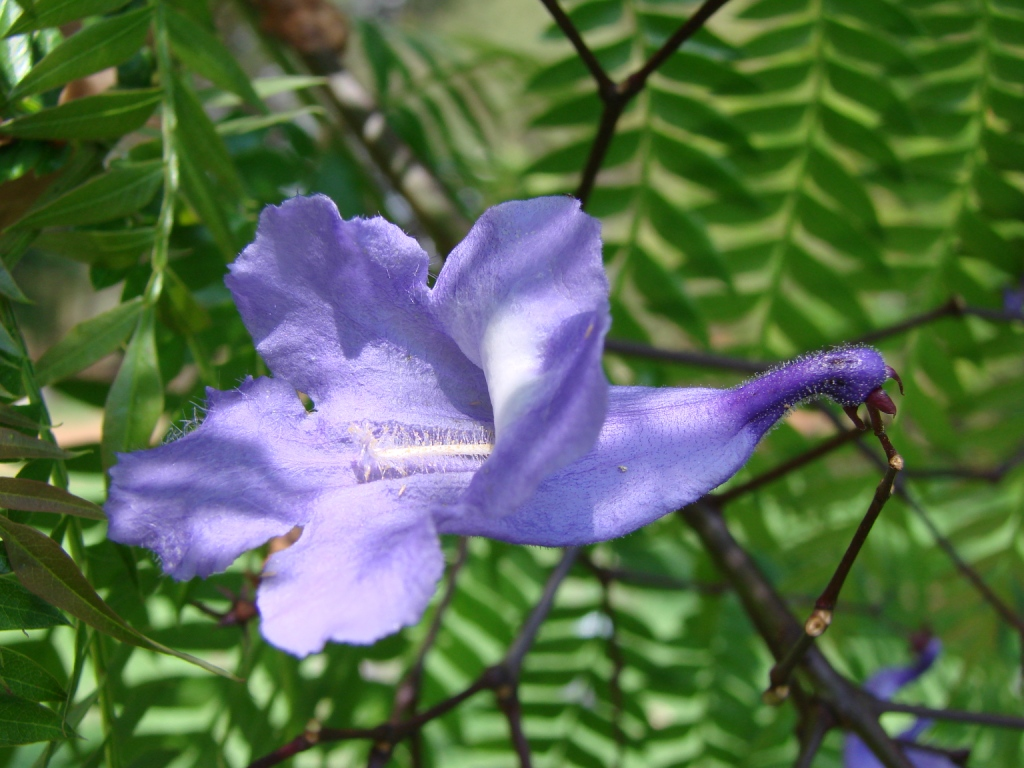
- A flower of Jacaranda mimosifolia

Scientific classification
- Kingdom: Plantae
- Clade: Embryophytes
- Clade: Tracheophytes
- Clade: Angiosperms
- Clade: Eudicots
- Clade: Asterids
- Order: Lamiales
- Family: Bignoniaceae
- Tribe: Jacarandeae
- Genus: Jacaranda; Juss.

Type species
- Jacaranda mimosifolia

Synonyms
- Digomphia Benth.; Etorloba Raf.; Icaranda Pers.; Kordelestris H.Kost.; Nematopogon (DC.) Bureau & K.Schum.; Pteropodium DC.; Rafinesquia Raf.

= Jacaranda =

Genus of trees

Jacaranda is a genus of 49 species of flowering plants in the family Bignoniaceae, native to tropical and subtropical regions of the Americas and cultivated around the world. The generic name is also used as the common name.

The species Jacaranda mimosifolia has achieved a cosmopolitan distribution due to introductions, to the extent that it has entered popular culture. It can be found growing as an environmental weed in Central America, the Caribbean, Spain, Portugal, southern and northern Africa, China, Australia, Rwanda and Cyprus.

== Etymology ==
The name is of South American (more specifically Tupi–Guarani) origin. The word jacaranda was described in A supplement to Mr. Chambers's Cyclopædia, 1st ed., (1753) as "a name given by some authors to the tree the wood of which is the log-wood, used in dyeing and medicine" and as being of Tupi–Guarani origin, by way of Portuguese. Although not consistent with the Guarani source, one common pronunciation of the name in English is given by /ˌdʒækəˈrændə/.

== Description ==
The species are shrubs to large trees ranging in size from 20 to 30 m (66 to 98 ft) tall. Most of its species have bipinnate leaves, leaves on the rest are pinnate or simple. Their wood tissue has narrow vessels and splayed parenchyma.

Jacaranda flowers are produced in conspicuous large panicles, each flower with a five-lobed blue to purple-blue corolla; A few species have white flowers. Flowers of this genus's species differ from other genera in their family by having staminodes longer than the stamens that not only make the flowers more visually interesting to pollinators like orchid bees, but also have glandular trichomes secreting plant metabolites that attract those bees. Jacaranda flowers also have tricolpate pollen, and a chromosome number of 18.

The fruit is an oblong to oval flattened capsule containing numerous slender seeds, this trait is shared with other species in the Jacarandeae tribe.

== Taxonomy ==
The genus is divided into two sections, sect. Monolobos and sect. Dilobos DC., based on the number of thecae on the anthers. Sect. Monolobos has 18 species and is found primarily in western South America, Central America, Mexico, and the Caribbean. Sect. Dilobos, which is believed to be the primitive form, has 31 species and is found primarily in southeastern Brazil including the Paraná River valley. The anatomy of the wood in the two sections also differs. Although usually treated in sect. Monolobos, J. copaia differs somewhat from all other members of the genus and may be intermediate between the two sections (Dos Santos & Miller 1997).

=== Species ===
Sect. Monolobos

- Jacaranda acutifolia Bonpl.
- Jacaranda arborea Urb.
- Jacaranda brasiliana (Lam.) Pers.
- Jacaranda caerulea (L.) J.St.-Hil.
- Jacaranda caucana Pittier
- Jacaranda copaia (Aubl.) D.Don
- Jacaranda cowellii Britton & P.Wilson
- Jacaranda cuspidifolia Mart. ex DC.
- Jacaranda decurrens Cham.
- Jacaranda ekmanii Alain
- Jacaranda hesperia Dugand.
- Jacaranda mimosifolia D.Don
- Jacaranda obtusifolia Humboldt & Bonpl.
- Jacaranda orinocensis Sandw.
- Jacaranda poitaei Urb.
- Jacaranda praetermissa Sandw.
- Jacaranda selleana Urb.
- Jacaranda sparrei A.H.Gentry

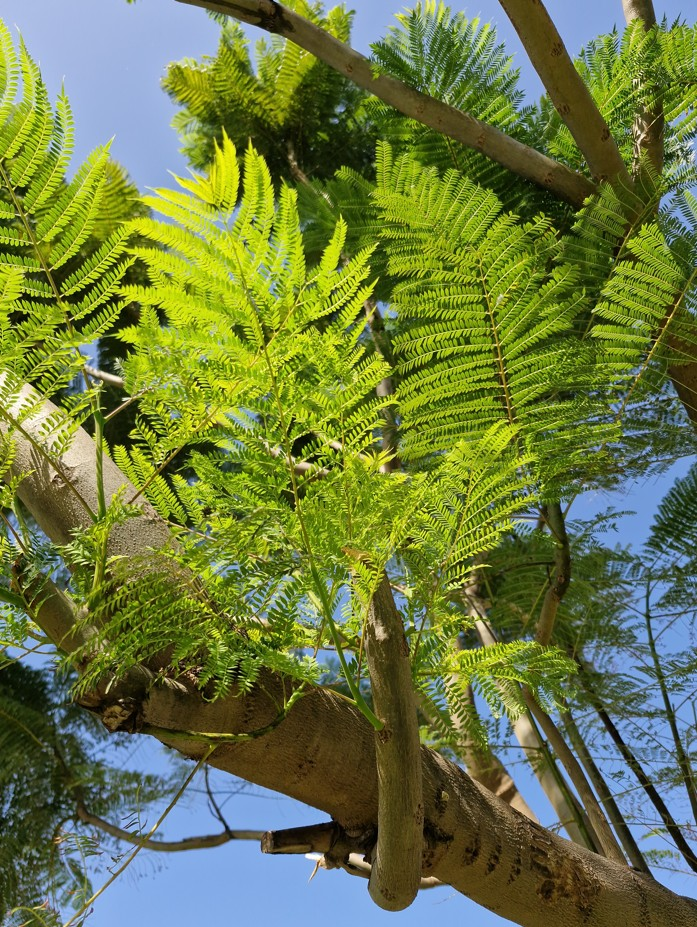
Jacaranda leaves in Elifelet Garden, Tel Aviv

Sect. Dilobos

- Jacaranda bracteata Bur. & K.Schum.
- Jacaranda bullata A.H.Gentry
- Jacaranda campinae A.Gentry & Morawetz
- Jacaranda carajasensis A.Gentry
- Jacaranda caroba (Vell.) DC.
- Jacaranda crassifolia Morawetz
- Jacaranda duckei Vattimo
- Jacaranda egleri Sandwith
- Jacaranda glabra (DC.) Bur. & K.Schum.
- Jacaranda grandifoliolata A.H.Gentry
- Jacaranda heterophylla M.M.Silva-Castro
- Jacaranda intricata A.Gentry & Morawetz
- Jacaranda irwinii A.Gentry
- Jacaranda jasminoides (Thunb.) Sandw.
- Jacaranda macrantha Cham.
- Jacaranda macrocarpa Bur. & K.Schum.
- Jacaranda micrantha Cham.
- Jacaranda montana Morawetz
- Jacaranda morii A.Gentry
- Jacaranda mutabilis Hassl.
- Jacaranda obovata Cham.
- Jacaranda oxyphylla Cham.
- Jacaranda paucifoliata Mart. ex DC.
- Jacaranda puberula Cham.
- Jacaranda racemosa Cham.
- Jacaranda rufa Manso
- Jacaranda rugosa A.H.Gentry
- Jacaranda simplicifolia K.Schum.
- Jacaranda subalpina Morawetz
- Jacaranda ulei Bur. & K.Schum.

== Cultivation ==
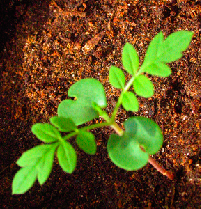
Jacaranda seedling

Jacaranda can be propagated from grafting, cuttings, and seeds, though plants grown from seeds take a long time to bloom. Jacaranda grows in well-drained soil and tolerates drought and brief spells of frost and freeze.

This genus thrives in full sun and sandy soils, which explains their abundance in warmer climates. Mature plants can survive in colder climates down to −7 °C (19 °F); however, they may not bloom as profusely. Younger plants are more fragile and may not survive in colder climates when temperatures drop below freezing.

== Uses ==
Several species are widely grown as ornamental plants throughout the subtropical regions of the world, valued for their intense flower displays. The most often seen is the blue jacaranda (Jacaranda mimosifolia; syn. J. acutifolia hort. non Bonpl.). Other members of the genus are also commercially important; for example the Copaia (Jacaranda copaia) is important for its timber because of its exceptionally long bole.

== Gallery ==
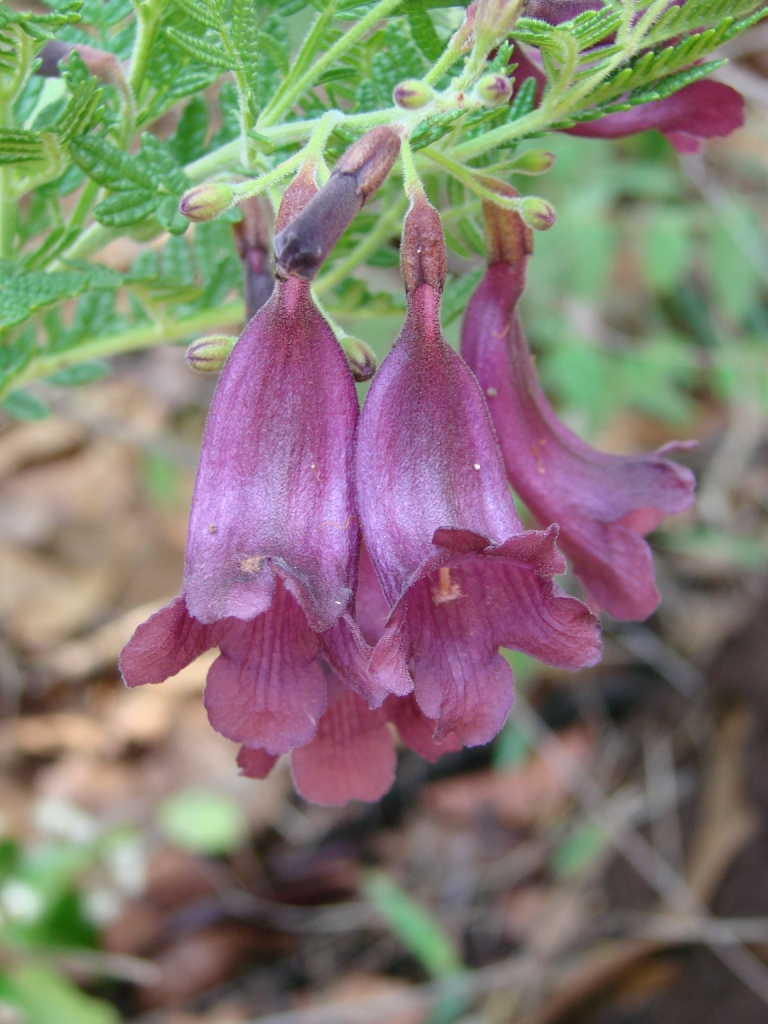
Flowers of Jacaranda ulei

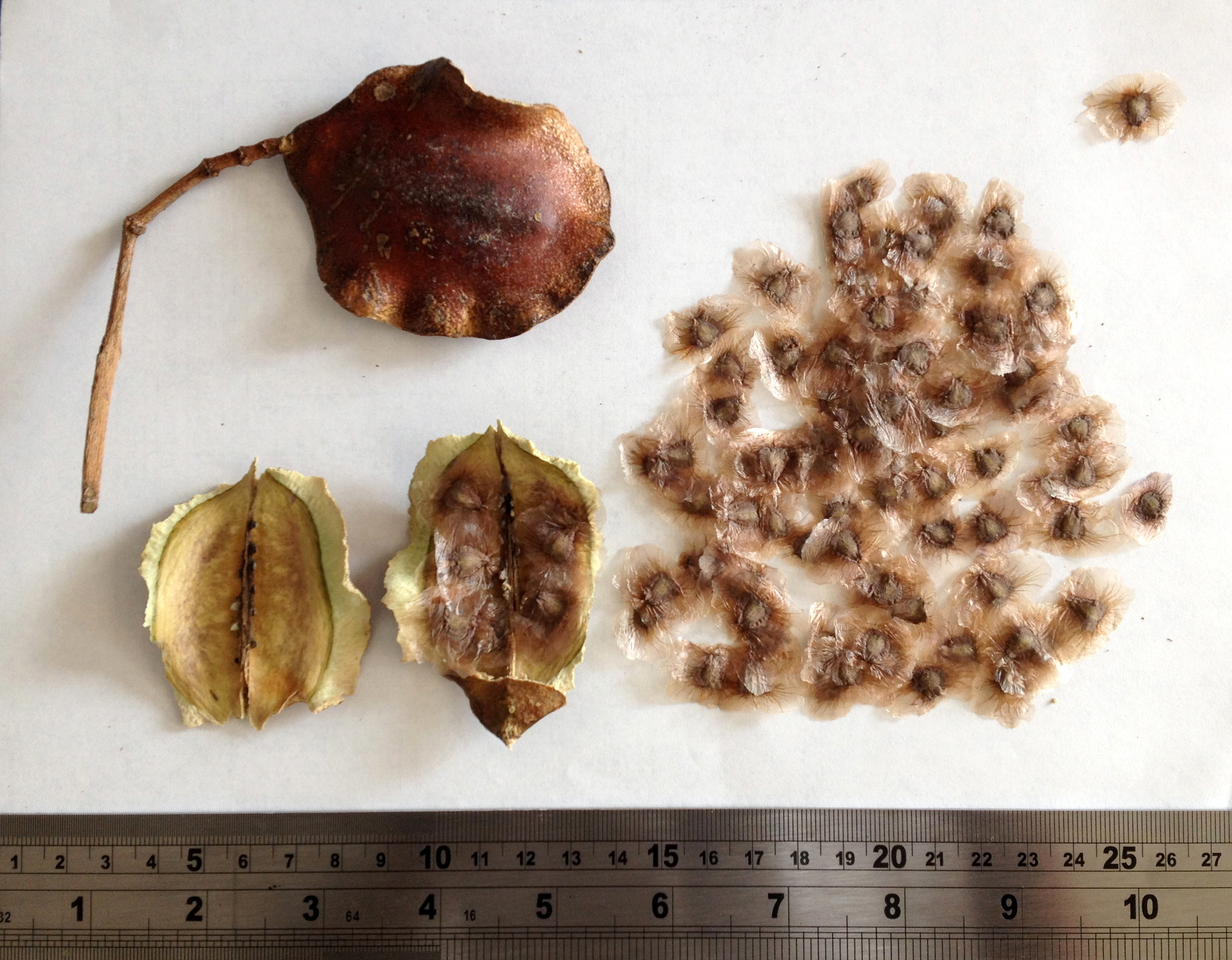
Jacaranda seeds

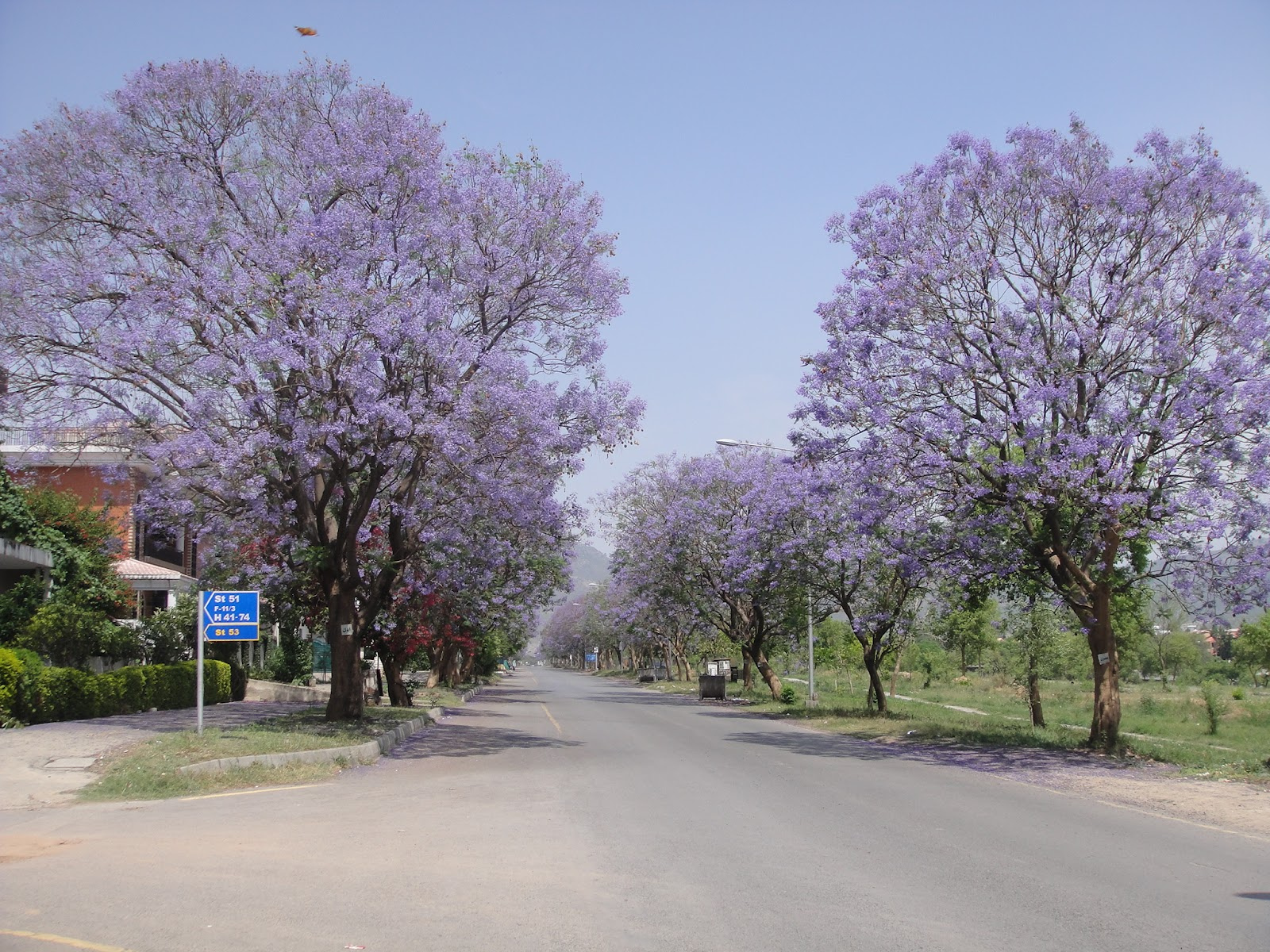
Jacaranda mimosifolia trees in full bloom in Islamabad, Pakistan

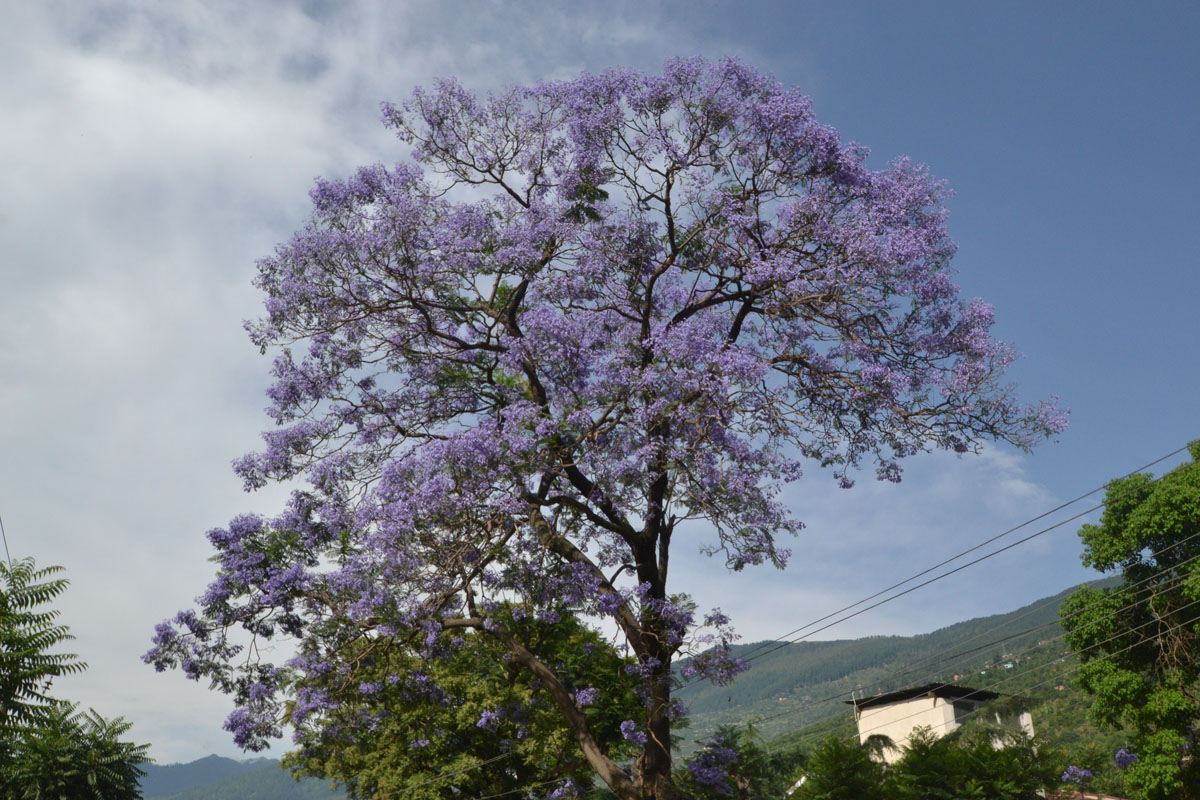
Jacaranda tree blooming in India

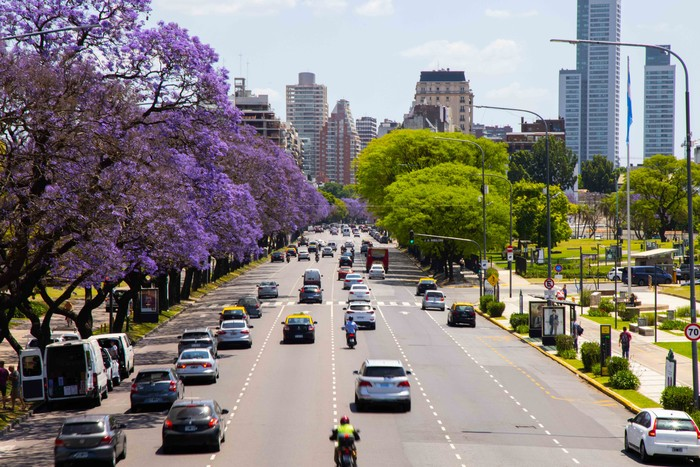
Jacaranda trees in bloom in Buenos Aires, Argentina
