= Jacaranda subalpina =

Scientific classification
- Kingdom: Plantae
- Clade: Tracheophytes
- Clade: Angiosperms
- Clade: Eudicots
- Clade: Asterids
- Order: Lamiales
- Family: Bignoniaceae
- Genus: Jacaranda
- Species: J. subalpina

Binomial name
- Jacaranda subalpina Morawetz

Species of tree

Jacaranda subalpina is a species of flowering tree native to Brazil.

== Description ==
Jacaranda subalpina grows to between 5 metres (16 ft) to 12 metres (39 ft) tall. The leaves are 25 to 45 cm in length and bipinnate, having between 11 and 23 pinnae and 17 to 23 leaflets. Leaflets are 0.8 to 4 cm long, 0.4 to 1.8 cm wide and "narrowly elliptic or oblong" in shape. The tops of the leaflets are dark green and the underside is "greenish gray" with sparse fine hairs. The calyx curves inward in a funnel shape. The flowers have purple petals and a white throat, and are 4.5 to 6.5 cm long and 3 to 5 cm wide at the mouth. The fruit is "subwoody", growing 5 to 6.5 cm long and 2.6 to 3.5 cm wide.
