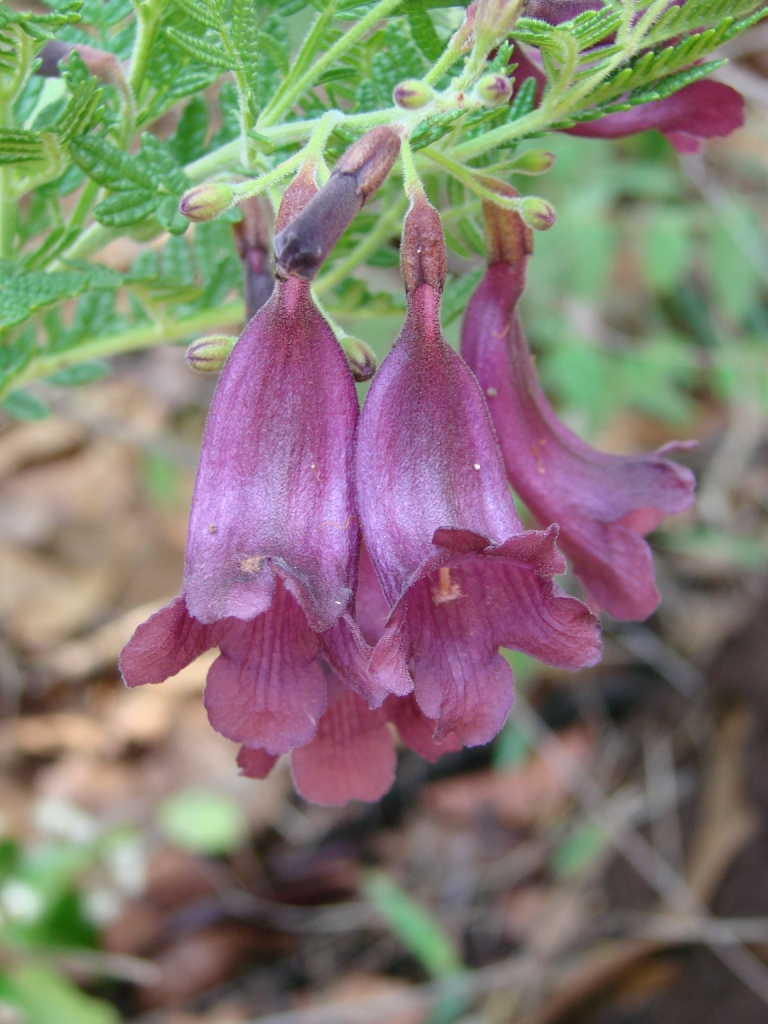
- Jacaranda ulei flower

Scientific classification
- Kingdom: Plantae
- Clade: Tracheophytes
- Clade: Angiosperms
- Clade: Eudicots
- Clade: Asterids
- Order: Lamiales
- Family: Bignoniaceae
- Genus: Jacaranda
- Species: J. ulei

Binomial name
- Jacaranda ulei Bur. & K.Schum.

= Jacaranda ulei =

Species of tree

Jacaranda ulei is a flowering tree native to the Cerrado region of Brazil. It was first described by Édouard Bureau and Karl Moritz Schumann in 1897.

== Description ==
Jacaranda ulei is a small tree, growing to between 0.6 metres (2 ft 0 in) and 1.5 metres (4 ft 11 in) tall. The leaves are 6 to 10 cm (2.4 to 3.9 in) in length and bipinnate, having between 8 and 12 pinnae and 6 to 16 leaflets. Leaflets are 15 to 20 cm (5.9 to 7.9 in) long, 3 to 5 cm (1.2 to 2.0 in) wide and "narrowly oblong" in shape. The flowers are deep purple in colour and arranged in a branched, Panicle form. They are 5 to 10mm long and 4 to 7 mm wide with 5 shallow dentate. The fruit is woody and "round to elliptic" in shape, growing 3.5 to 5.5 cm (1.4 to 2.2 in) long and 3 to 4 cm (1.2 to 1.6 in) wide.

The species is a resprouter, with its root system allowing it to survive wild fires and droughts seen in the savanna ecosystem of the Cerrado region of Brazil.

== Uses ==
The roots of the plant have been used as a traditional folk remedy to treat urinary tract infections, amoebiasis, backache, rheumatism and skin disorders.
