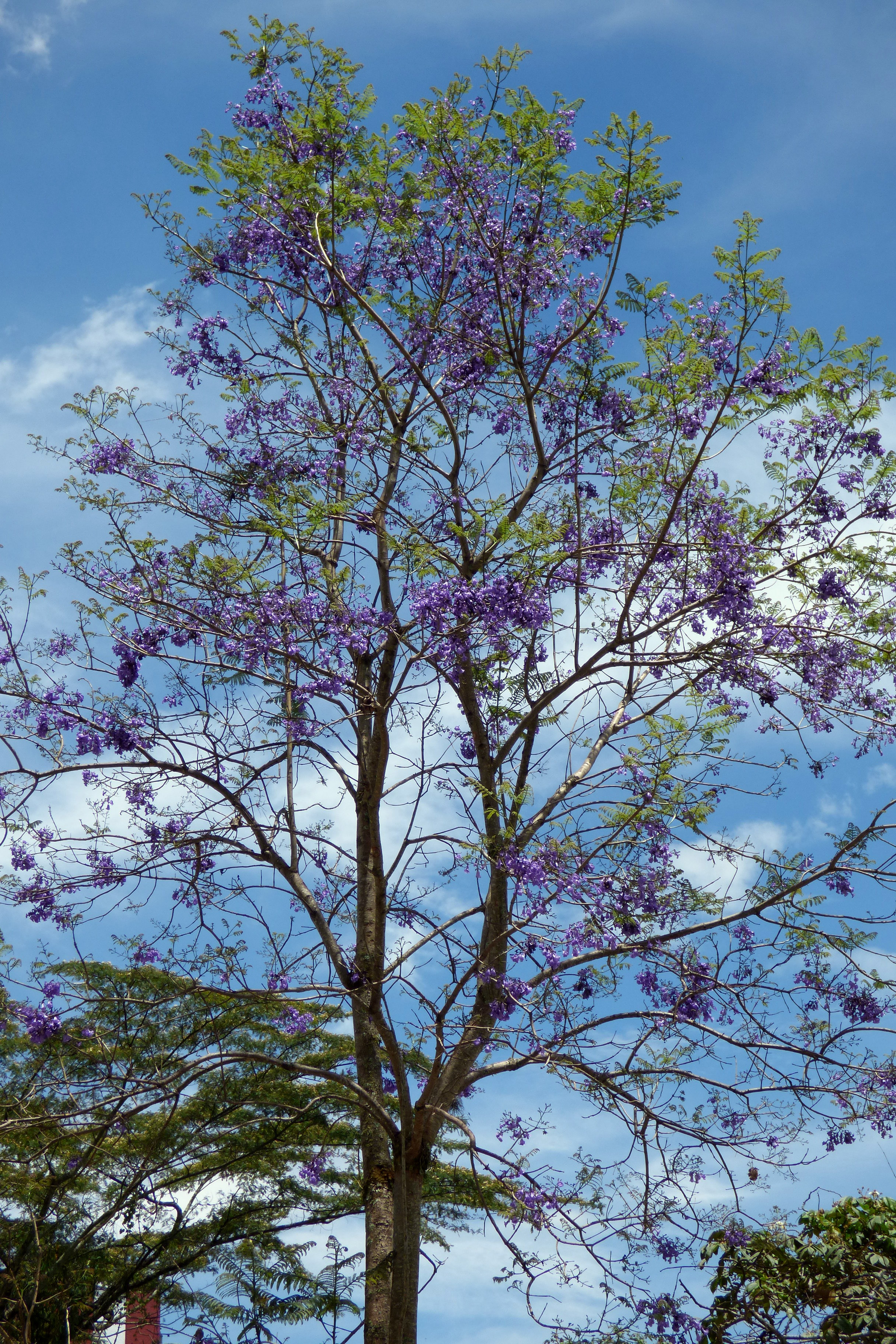

Conservation status
- Least Concern (IUCN 3.1)

Scientific classification
- Kingdom: Plantae
- Clade: Tracheophytes
- Clade: Angiosperms
- Clade: Eudicots
- Clade: Asterids
- Order: Lamiales
- Family: Bignoniaceae
- Genus: Jacaranda
- Species: J. caucana

Binomial name
- Jacaranda caucana Pittier

= Jacaranda caucana =

Species of tree

Jacaranda caucana is a species of flowering tree first described by Swiss-born botanist Henri François Pittier in 1917. It is native to Costa Rica, Panama, Venezuela and Colombia.

== Description ==
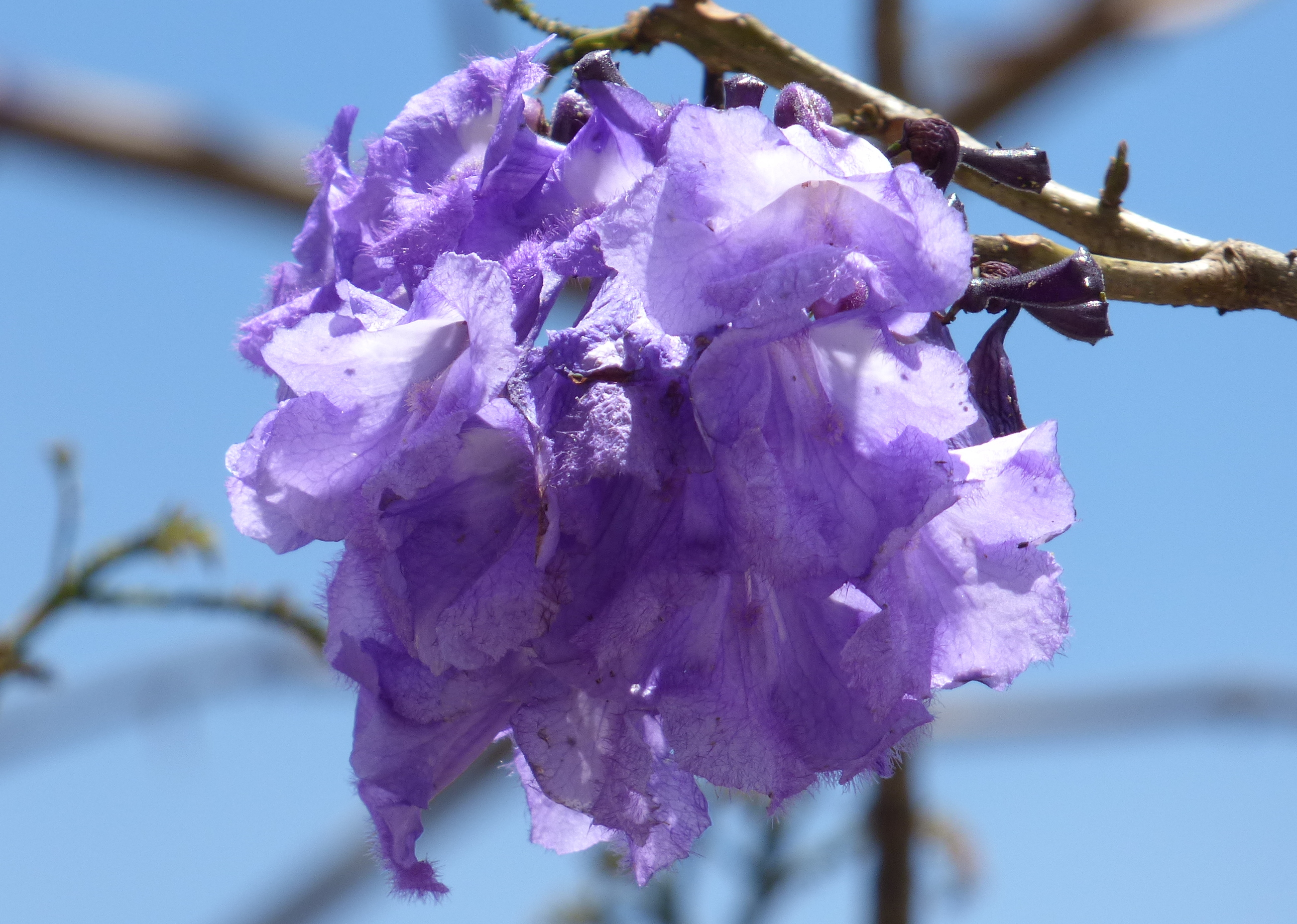
Flowers

Jacaranda caucana is medium-sized with a straight trunk. The crown is wide and round with fern-like leaves that almost reach the ground. The leaves are small, pointed and divided into leaflets and subleaflets. During the dry season large, purple flowers are produced. The fruits are "woody capsules". The deep purple flowers mean it is commonly used as an ornamental tree in gardens.
