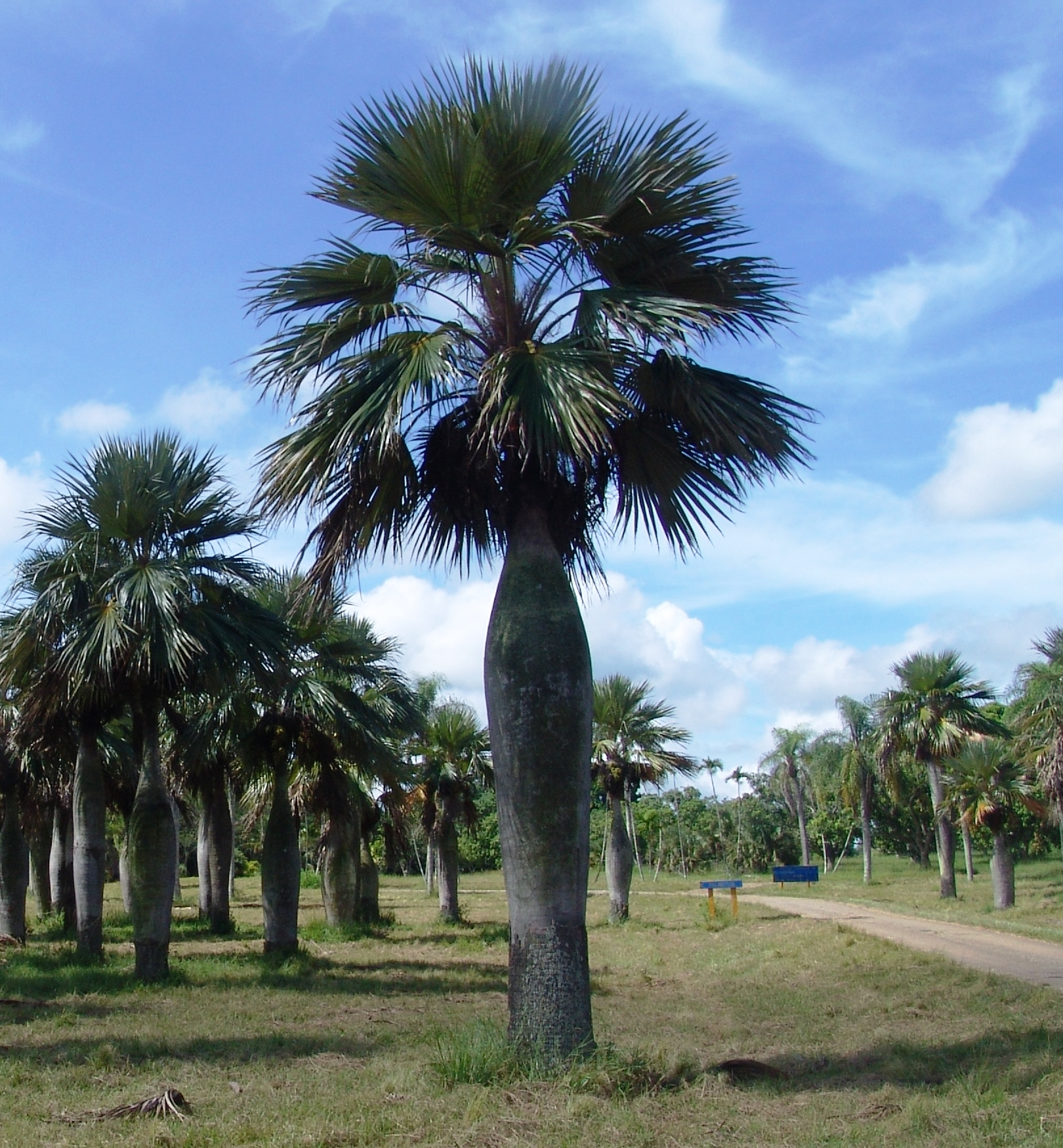

Scientific classification
- Kingdom: Plantae
- Clade: Tracheophytes
- Clade: Angiosperms
- Clade: Monocots
- Clade: Commelinids
- Order: Arecales
- Family: Arecaceae
- Subfamily: Coryphoideae
- Tribe: Trachycarpeae
- Genus: Colpothrinax; Griseb. & H.Wendl.

Species
- Colpothrinax aphanopetala Colpothrinax cookii Colpothrinax wrightii

= Colpothrinax =

Genus of palms

Colpothrinax is a genus of palms native to Central America and the Caribbean. It is a member of the subfamily Coryphoideae, tribe Trachycarpeae, although its placement within the subtribe is uncertain based on plastid DNA.

== Species ==
Image	Scientific name	Distribution
	Colpothrinax aphanopetala	from southeast Nicaragua to Panama
	Colpothrinax cookii	from Belize to Honduras
	Colpothrinax wrightii	endemic to southwest Cuba including the Isle of Youth.
