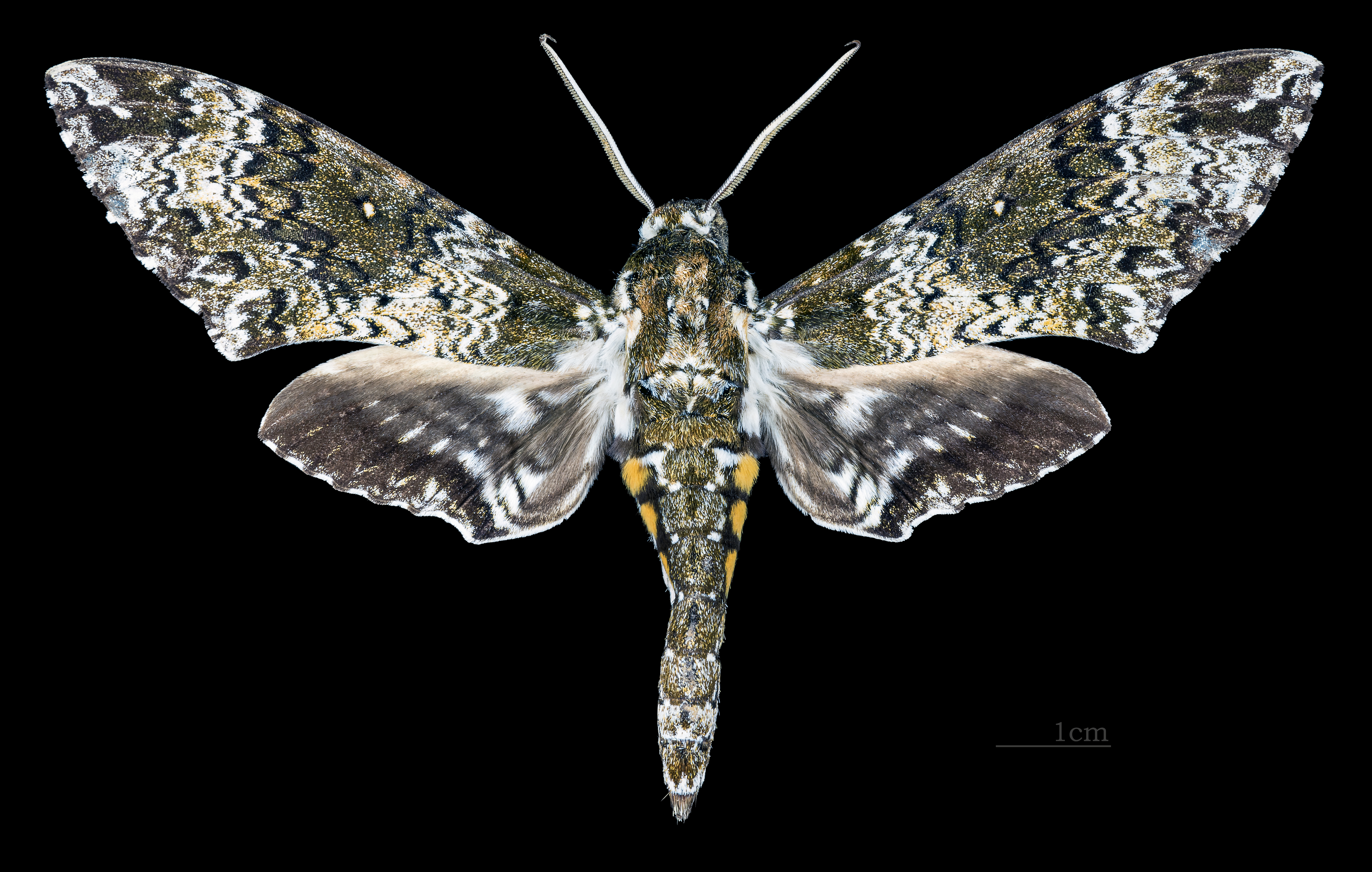
- Male drosal
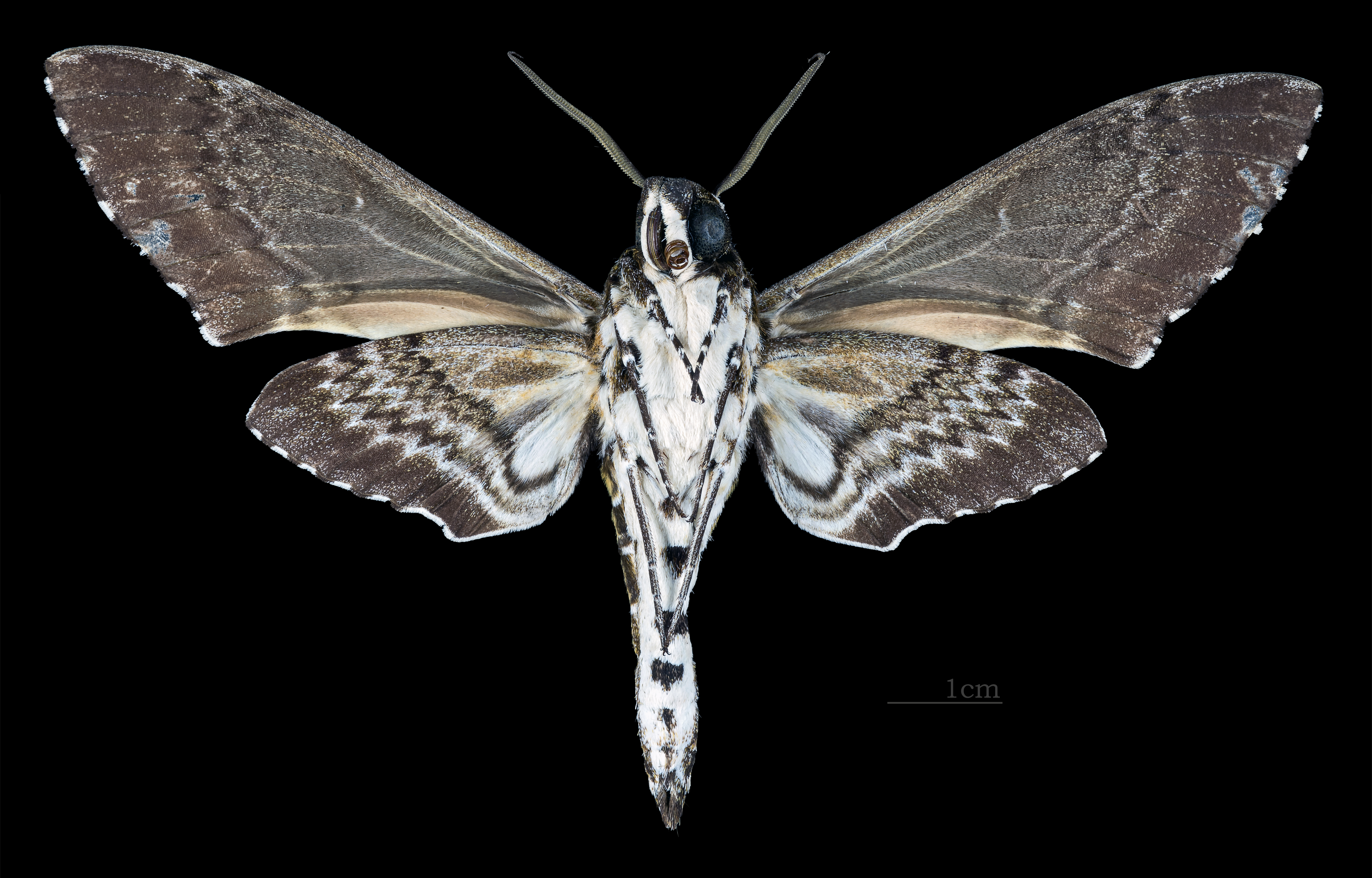
- Male ventral

Scientific classification
- Kingdom: Animalia
- Phylum: Arthropoda
- Class: Insecta
- Order: Lepidoptera
- Family: Sphingidae
- Genus: Manduca
- Species: M. sesquiplex

Binomial name
- Manduca sesquiplex (Boisduval, 1870)

Synonyms
- Sphinx sesquiplex Boisduval, 1870; Sphinx strix Boisduval, 1870; Protoparce sesquiplex opima Rothschild & Jordan, 1903

= Manduca sesquiplex =

Species of moth

Manduca sesquiplex is a moth of the family Sphingidae. It is known from Mexico, Costa Rica and Nicaragua.

The wingspan is 119–120 mm. The ground colour of the body and wings is whitish smoky grey, while ssp. opima is more greenish. There is probably one generation per year with adults on wing from September to November in Costa Rica. In Nicaragua, there appear to be at least three generations with records for May, July and September.

The larvae probably feed on Solanaceae species.

== Subspecies ==
- Manduca sesquiplex sesquiplex (Mexico)
- Manduca sesquiplex opima (Rothschild & Jordan, 1903) (Costa Rica and Nicaragua)
