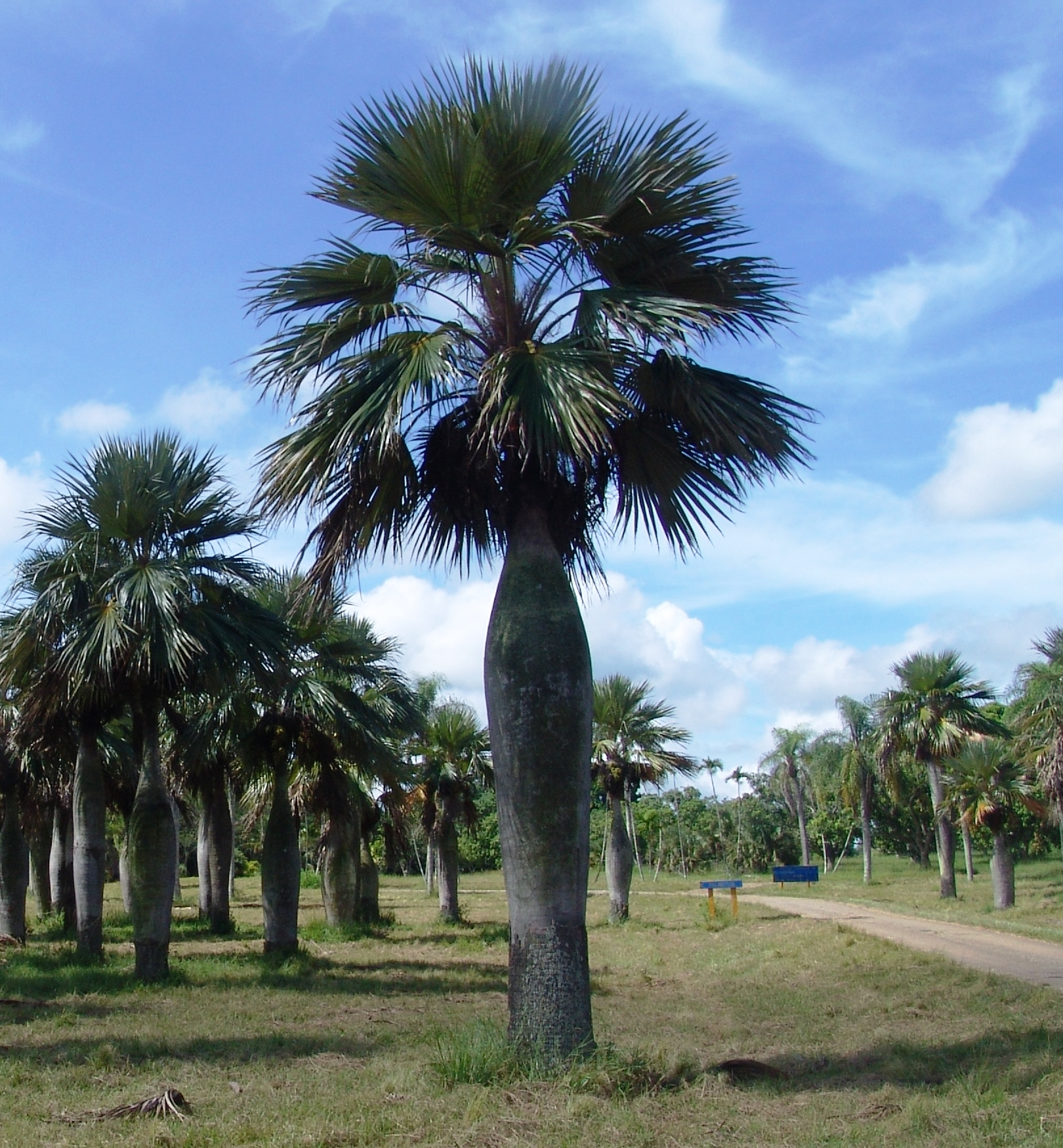

Conservation status
- Vulnerable (IUCN 3.1)

Scientific classification
- Kingdom: Plantae
- Clade: Tracheophytes
- Clade: Angiosperms
- Clade: Monocots
- Clade: Commelinids
- Order: Arecales
- Family: Arecaceae
- Tribe: Trachycarpeae
- Genus: Colpothrinax
- Species: C. wrightii

Binomial name
- Colpothrinax wrightii Griseb. & H. Wendl. ex Siebert & Voss

Synonyms
- Pritchardia wrightii

= Colpothrinax wrightii =

Species of flowering plant

Colpothrinax wrightii, the palma barrigona, is a species of flowering plant in the family Arecaceae.

It is endemic to Cuba.

== Description ==
The trunk grows between 6 and 15 m (20 and 49 ft) tall, with a swollen midsection reaching up to 50 cm (20 in) in diameter. Young trunks are covered in fibrous leaf sheaths, while mature trunks are smooth and bare. The crown holds 10 to 20 large, fan-shaped leaves with petioles around 1 to 1.5 m (3.3 to 4.9 ft) long. The inflorescence extends up to 1.5 m (4.9 ft), with creamy yellow branches that turn orange as the fruit develops. Flowers are small, yellow, and arranged in clusters. The fruit is round, 1.1 to 1.6 cm (0.4 to 0.6 in) in diameter, containing a single seed about 1 cm (0.4 in) across.
