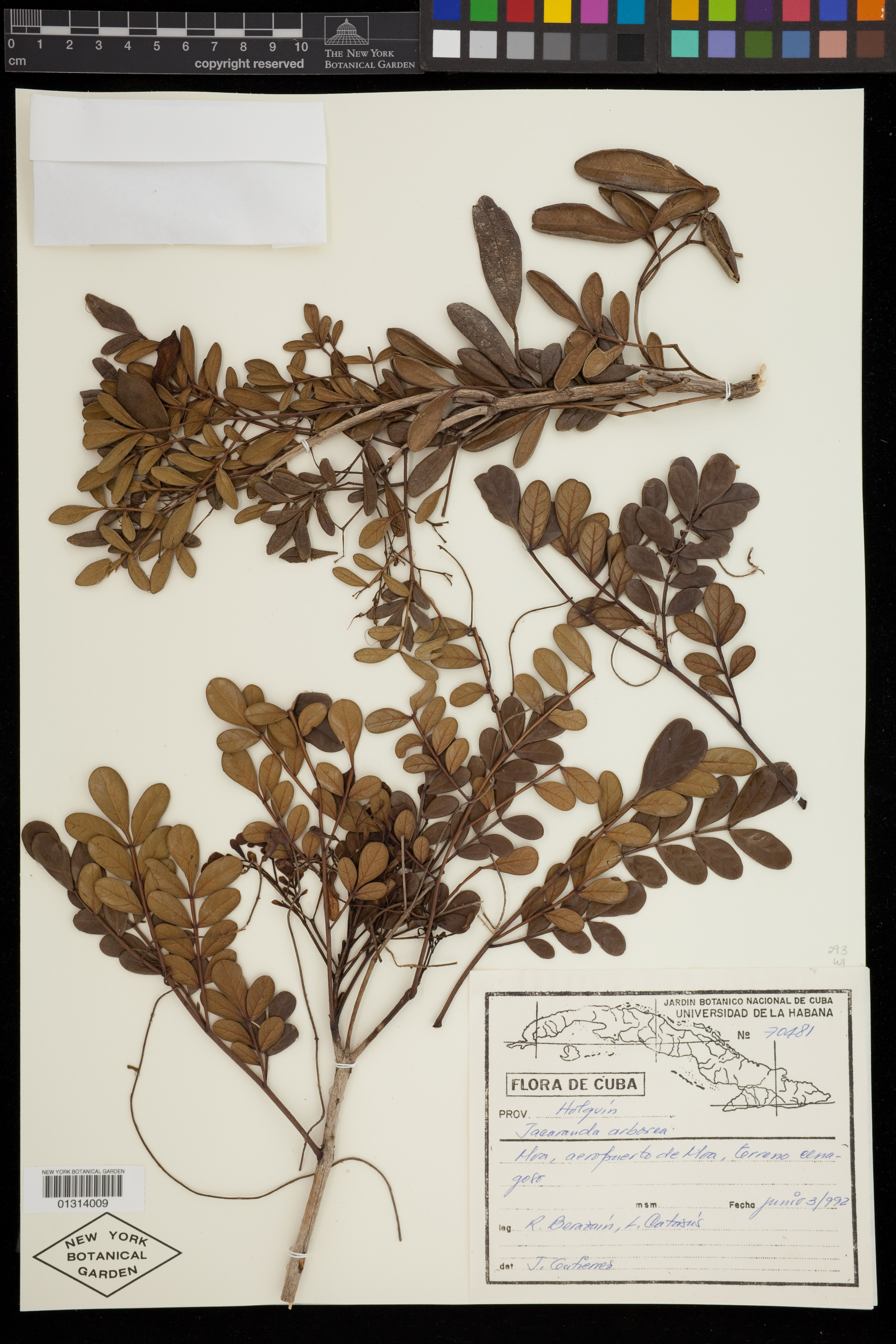

Conservation status
- Vulnerable (IUCN 2.3)

Scientific classification
- Kingdom: Plantae
- Clade: Tracheophytes
- Clade: Angiosperms
- Clade: Eudicots
- Clade: Asterids
- Order: Lamiales
- Family: Bignoniaceae
- Genus: Jacaranda
- Species: J. arborea

Binomial name
- Jacaranda arborea Urban

= Jacaranda arborea =

Species of tree

Jacaranda arborea is a species of flowering plant in the family Bignoniaceae. It is endemic to Cuba. It is threatened by habitat loss.
