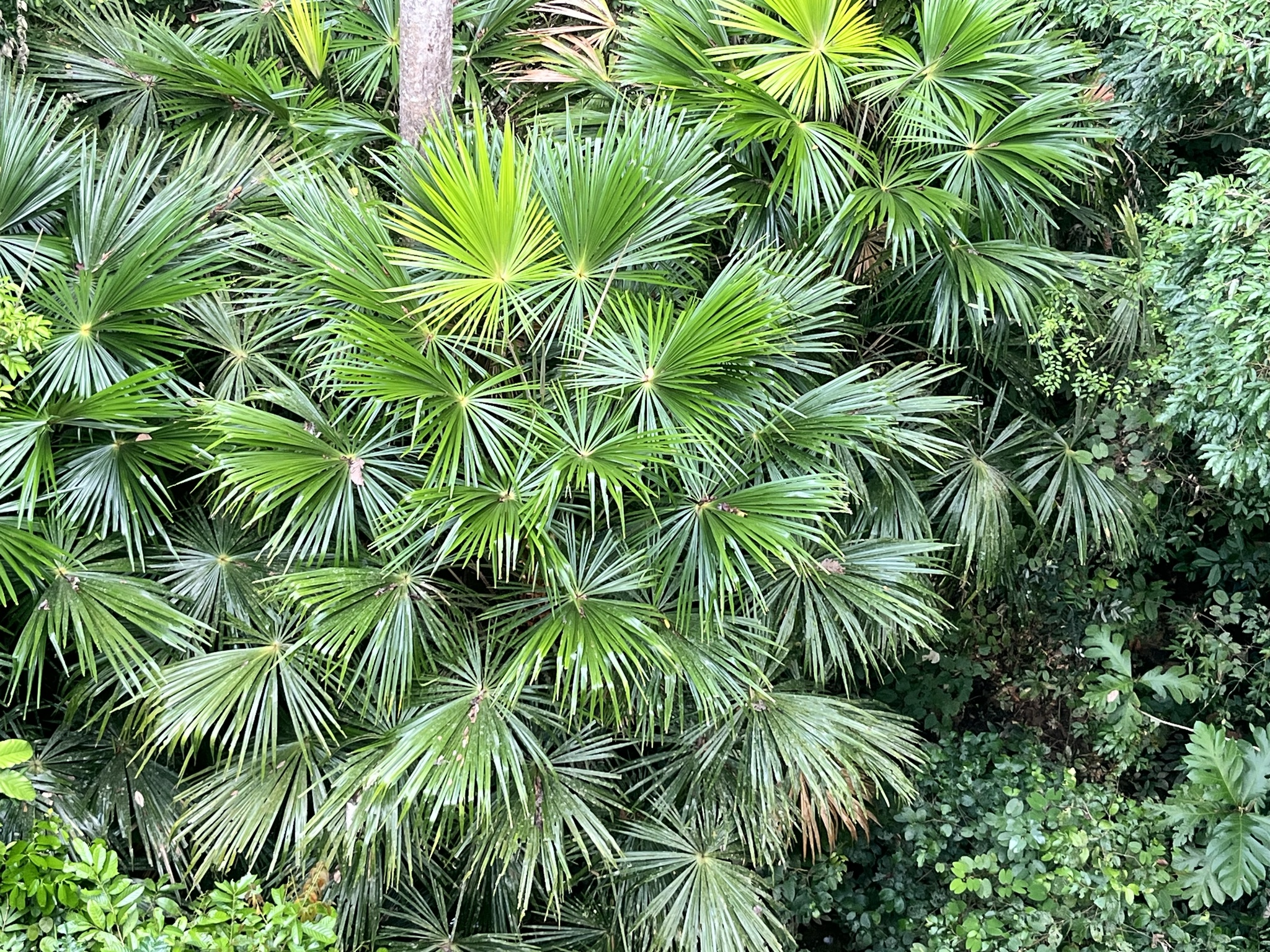
- Pholidocarpus majadum

Scientific classification
- Kingdom: Plantae
- Clade: Tracheophytes
- Clade: Angiosperms
- Clade: Monocots
- Clade: Commelinids
- Order: Arecales
- Family: Arecaceae
- Subfamily: Coryphoideae
- Tribe: Trachycarpeae
- Genus: Pholidocarpus; Blume in J.J.Roemer & J.A.Schultes 1830

= Pholidocarpus =

Genus of palms

Pholidocarpus is a genus of flowering plants in the family Arecaceae, native to Southeast Asia.

== Species ==
The genus contains the following species:

- Pholidocarpus ihur (Giseke) Blume - Sulawesi, Maluku
- Pholidocarpus kingianus (Becc.) Ridl. - Peninsular Malaysia
- Pholidocarpus macrocarpus Becc. - Peninsular Malaysia, Thailand, Sumatra
- Pholidocarpus majadum Becc. - Borneo
- Pholidocarpus mucronatus Becc. - Sumatra
- Pholidocarpus sumatranus Becc. - Sumatra
