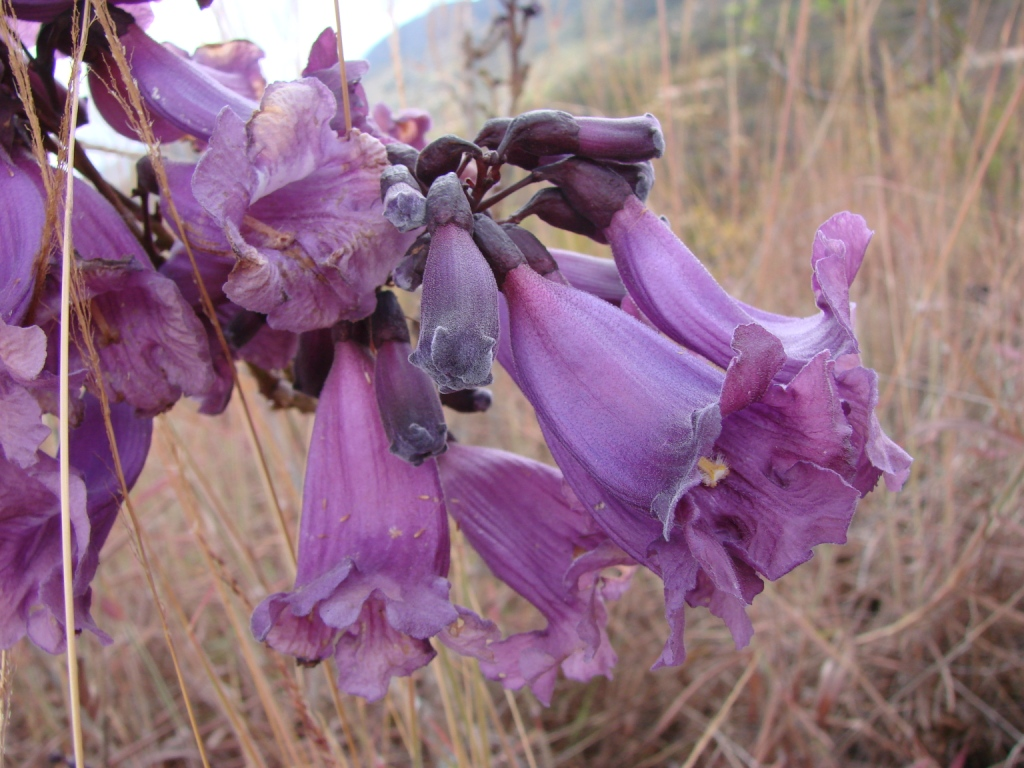

Conservation status
- Least Concern (IUCN 3.1)

Scientific classification
- Kingdom: Plantae
- Clade: Tracheophytes
- Clade: Angiosperms
- Clade: Eudicots
- Clade: Asterids
- Order: Lamiales
- Family: Bignoniaceae
- Genus: Jacaranda
- Species: J. caroba

Binomial name
- Jacaranda caroba (Vell.) DC.

= Jacaranda caroba =

Species of tree

Jacaranda caroba, the Brazilian caroba-tree, is a medicinal plant native to Cerrado vegetation in Brazil.
