= Quercus oleoides =

- Quercus oleoides foliage

Conservation status
- Least Concern (IUCN 3.1)

Scientific classification
- Kingdom: Plantae
- Clade: Tracheophytes
- Clade: Angiosperms
- Clade: Eudicots
- Clade: Rosids
- Order: Fagales
- Family: Fagaceae
- Genus: Quercus
- Subgenus: Quercus subg. Quercus
- Section: Quercus sect. Virentes
- Species: Q. oleoides

Binomial name
- Quercus oleoides Schltdl. & Cham.

Synonyms
- List: Quercus lutescens M.Martens & Galeotti; Quercus oleoides var. australis Trel.; Quercus oleoides var. lutescens (M.Martens & Galeotti) A.Camus; Quercus oleoides f. lutescens (M.Martens & Galeotti) Trel.; Quercus retusa Liebm.

Species of oak tree

Quercus oleoides, with Spanish common names encina or encino, is a Mesoamerican species of oak in the southern live oaks section of the genus Quercus (section Virentes). It grows in dry forests and pastureland of eastern and southern Mexico and much of Central America, from Guanacaste Province in Costa Rica north as far as the State of Tamaulipas in northeastern Mexico.

Quercus oleoides is a slow-growing tree, reaching 8–15 metres (26–49 feet) in height. Its pale gray leaves are evergreen, thick, hard, 4 to 11 centimetres (1 1/2 to 4 1/4 inches) long, 2 to 5 cm (3/4 to 2 in) wide, oblong or elliptic. It flowers from December through May, with male catkins that are 3 to 4 cm (1 1/4 to 1 1/2 in) long, and female catkins that are 3 to 30 millimetres (1/8 to 1 1/8 inches) long, containing one to six flowers, each about 7 mm long.

Its wood is extremely heavy with intercrossed grains; the sapwood is white, and heartwood brown.
