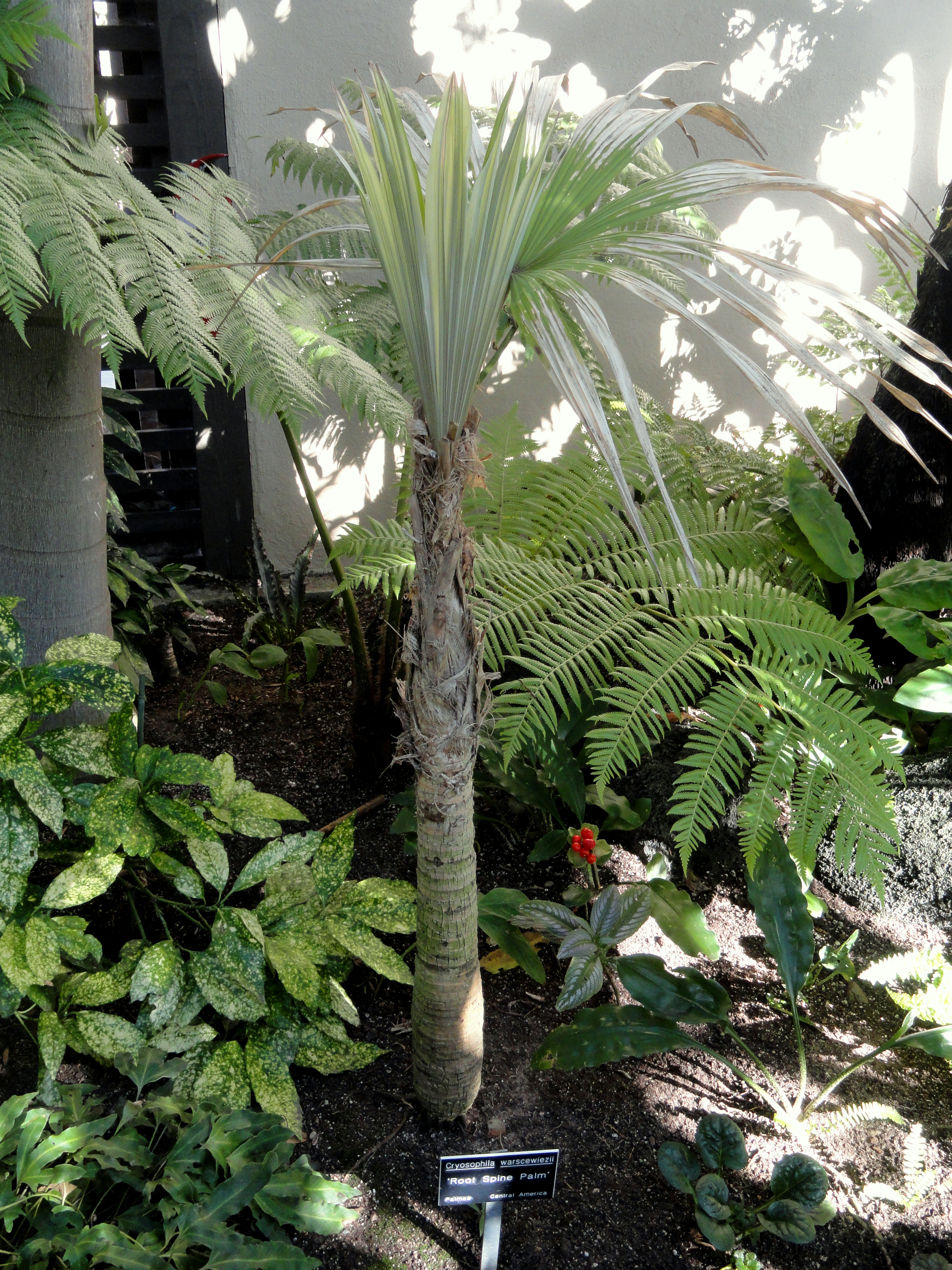

Scientific classification
- Kingdom: Plantae
- Clade: Tracheophytes
- Clade: Angiosperms
- Clade: Monocots
- Clade: Commelinids
- Order: Arecales
- Family: Arecaceae
- Genus: Cryosophila
- Species: C. warscewiczii

Binomial name
- Cryosophila warscewiczii (H.Wendl.) Bartlett

Synonyms
- Acanthorrhiza warscewiczii H.Wendl.; Cryosophila aldbia

= Cryosophila warscewiczii =

Species of palm

Cryosophila warscewiczii is a species of flowering plant in the family Arecaceae, endemic to Central America.

== Description ==
This species grows up to about 10 m in height. The trunk is relatively slender, 10–15 cm across above its widened base, and young individuals are often covered in spines derived from adventitious roots that may be simple or branched, reaching 16–35 cm in length. In mature plants, spines are generally confined to the basal portion of the trunk.

The leaves are very large, with petioles longer than the leaf blades and shaped with a broad central groove. Leaf blades are roughly circular, 1.5–2 m or more in diameter, with palmate venation and irregular lobes that can extend nearly to the base, especially on the lower margins. The upper surface of the leaf is smooth and green, while the underside is densely covered in fine, whitish hairs that give a slightly glaucous appearance; occasionally, brown, web-like hairs occur along the veins. Juvenile leaves are triangular and deeply divided into two or three lobes (with additional lobes developing as the plant matures), and they are densely hairy.

This plant produces inflorescences between the leaves that hang downward. The spathelets are short, tapering, and woolly on the exterior; these structures eventually fall off. Outer spathelets are tougher and often exhibit two ridges, whereas the inner spathelets are longer and wrap around the base of spadix branches, which measure 15–30 cm. The spadix itself has a thick main axis and lateral branches 30–75 cm long, densely covered with flowers.

Flowers are bisexual and have three main segments. Sepals are elongated, and the petals are broad, concave, and 2.5–4 mm long, forming a narrow tube with stiff, upright edges. There are six stamens, arranged in three pairs with flattened filaments fused at the base, slightly longer than the petals, and drooping near the tip. Anthers are about 1 mm long and hang outside the corolla near the apex. Pistils are narrow, tapering, and curve slightly outward near the tip; the stigmas are positioned just above the corolla throat.

The fruit is small, round to obovoid, 1–2 cm in diameter, and white when ripe. The pericarp is thin, and each fruit contains a single seed approximately 8 mm in diameter.
