= Williams Conservatory =

Botanical garden and greenhouse in Laramie, Wyoming, United States

- Location within Wyoming
- Location: 1000 E. University Ave Laramie, Wyoming 82071
- Coordinates: 41.3140073°N 105.5849052°W
- Opened: 1994
- Operator: University of Wyoming
- Website: www.uwyo.edu/conservatory

The Williams Conservatory is located in Laramie, Wyoming at the campus of the University of Wyoming. It opened in 1994. The main greenhouse is filled with exotic plants from various climates and biomes. The Conservatory is open daily for public and it receives hundreds of visitors each year.

== History ==
The Williams Conservatory was built in 1994. It was funded by private donations from Louis O. and Terua P. Williams and grant from the National Science Foundation to support maintenance and research.

== Founders ==
Prior to funding new greenhouse for Conservatory Louis O. and Terua P. Williams has been supporters of the University of Wyoming Botany Department for many years. Couple first met in Jackson Hole, Wyoming where Terua was a school teacher and Louis was a young botanist. Louis earned his B.S. and M.S. degrees from the University of Wyoming under the guidance of Aven Nelson. Louis worked on his Ph.D. thesis at Washington State University, and upon receiving Ph.D., worked at Harvard University, the Pan-American School of Agriculture in Honduras, and the U.S. Department of Agriculture.

From 1964 until his retirement in 1973 Louis was a department chair for the Field Museum of Natural History in Chicago. Through his career for many years Louis was also the editor of the American Orchid Society Bulletin. To acknowledge generous support from Louis and Terua Williams to new Conservatory, the University of Wyoming named the conservatory in their honor. Cryosophila williamsii is also named in honor of Louis Otho Williams.

== Collections ==
The Williams Conservatory collection presents several hundreds of plants from 76 plant families. Most resent accusations include Black Bat Flower (Tacca chantrieri), a Pelican Flower (Aristolochia gigantea), a Hanging Lobster Claw plants (Heliconia rostrata), and notorious for it odor Corpse Flower (Amorphophallus titanum), which bloom years apart.

== See also ==
- List of botanical gardens and arboretums in Wyoming
- Louis Otho Williams
