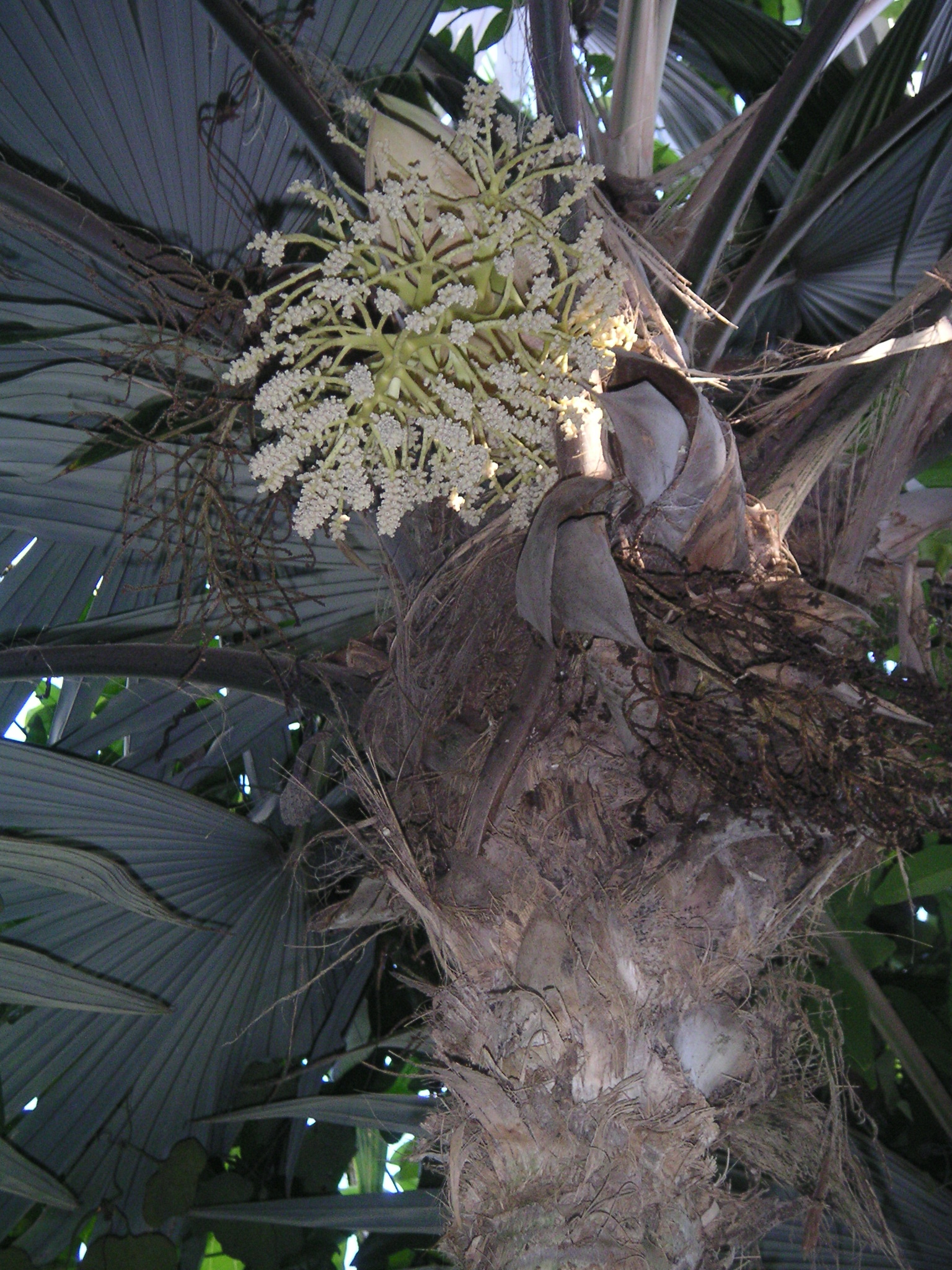
- Cryosophila warscewiczii at the Royal Botanic Gardens, Kew
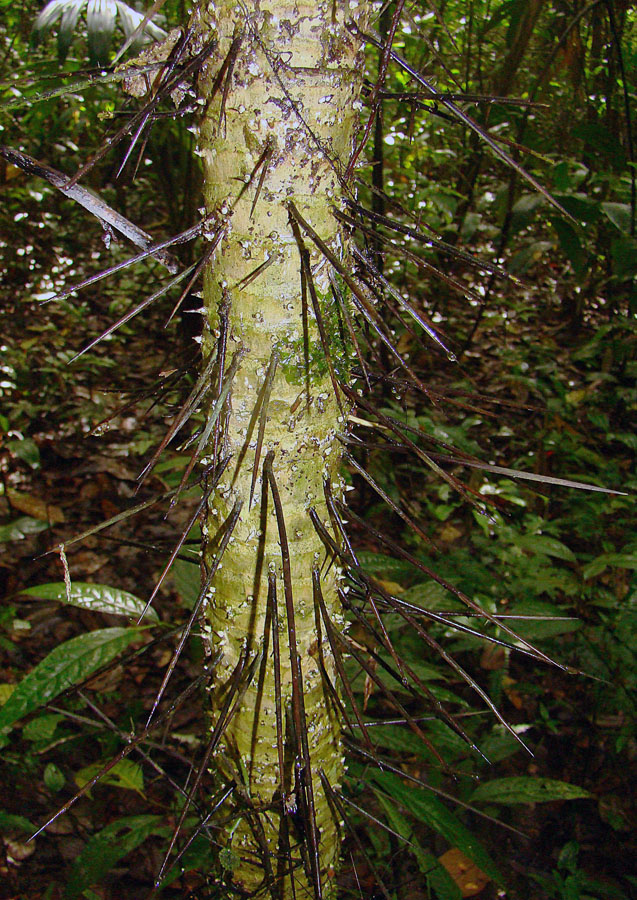
- Root spines on the trunk of Cryosophila warscewiczii.

Scientific classification
- Kingdom: Plantae
- Clade: Tracheophytes
- Clade: Angiosperms
- Clade: Monocots
- Clade: Commelinids
- Order: Arecales
- Family: Arecaceae
- Subfamily: Coryphoideae
- Tribe: Cryosophileae
- Genus: Cryosophila; Blume

Species
- See text

Synonyms
- Acanthorrhiza H.Wendl.

= Cryosophila =

Genus of palms

Cryosophila is a genus of medium-sized fan palms that range from central Mexico to northern Colombia. Species in the genus can be readily distinguished from related genera by their distinctive downward-pointing spines on the stem, which are actually modified roots. They are known as the "root spine palms".

== Description ==
Cryosophila is a genus of medium-sized, single-stemmed (or rarely multi-stemmed) palms with fan-shaped (or palmate) leaves and spiny stems. The stems range in height from 0.5 to 15 metres (1.6 to 49.2 ft), with diameters between 4 and 20 centimetres (1.6 and 7.9 in). Plants have between five and 35 leaves with elongated petioles. The leaves are often whitish-grey on the lower surface. The whitish flowers are bisexual with six stamens and three carpels. The fruit are white and smooth, with a single seed.

Cryosophila is distinguished from related genera by its long, branched spines which are derived from modified roots. These downward-pointing spines cover the trunk, often quite densely. The genus is one of the few palms which use modified roots as spines, and its spines are unlike any others in morphology or appearance. The density of spines varies from less than 25 over a 10 cm (3.9 in) length of stem in some species to others where the entire stem is covered by a dense mass of spines.

== Taxonomy ==
- Cryosophileae
  - Trithrinax
  - - - Itaya
      - Sabinaria
    - - Chelyocarpus
      - - Cryosophila
        - - - Schippia
            - - Thrinax
              - - Leucothrinax
                - Hemithrinax
          - - Zombia
            - Coccothrinax

Simplified phylogeny of the Cryosophileae based on four nuclear genes and the matK plastid gene.

In the first edition of Genera Palmarum (1987), Natalie Uhl and John Dransfield placed the genus Cryosophila in subfamily Coryphoideae, tribe Corypheae and subtribe Thrinacinae Subsequent phylogenetic analyses showed that the Old World and New World members of Thrinacinae are not closely related. As a consequence, Cryosophila and related genera were places in their own tribe, Cryosophileae. Within this tribe, Cryosophila appears to be most closely related to the genus Schippia.

=== History ===
The earliest botanical description of the species in the genus were made by Alexander von Humboldt, Aimé Bonpland and Carl Sigismund Kunth in 1816. They named two species, Corypha nana and Chamaerops mocini. Although these species were placed in different genera (both of which are now considered to be restricted to the Old World), today they are both thought to represent the same species—Cryosophila nana. In 1838 or 1839 Carl Ludwig Blume coined the name Cryosophila specifically for C. nana, but did not actually publish the combination and it was only validated in 1887 with the publication of Blume's combination by Carl E. Salomon in 1887. German botanist Hermann Wendland established a new genus, Acanthorrhiza, in 1869. He included two species in the genus, A. aculeata, which he transferred from Trithrinax where it had been placed by Danish botanist Frederik Michael Liebmann when he described it in 1853, and A. warscewiczii, for which Wendland provided the first description. Acanthorrhiza aculeata was based on a specimen now considered to belong to C. nana, but was defined in such a way that it also included another species, C. stauracantha. It was not until 1935 that American botanist Harley Bartlett realised that A. aculeata was the same as the pair of species that had been described by Kunth.

Both Corypha nana and Chamaerops mocini had been published at the same time in the same work, which meant that Bartlett had to designate a basionym, the "original" validly published name for the species. Bartlett chose the former, and went on to describe three new species. Paul H. Allen described two new species in 1953, bringing the total number of species to seven. Based on Randall J. Evans' doctoral dissertation, Henderson and colleagues recognised nine species in the genus, although they expressed the concern that the fragmentation of populations by habitat destruction may have exaggerated the difference between remaining populations, leading to an overestimate in the number of species. In his 1995 monograph on the genus, Evans recognised 10 species and two subspecies.

=== Species ===
The genus consists of 10 known species

- Cryosophila bartlettii R.J.Evans - Panama
- Cryosophila cookii Bartlett - Costa Rica
- Cryosophila grayumii R.J.Evans - Costa Rica
- Cryosophila guagara P.H.Allen - Costa Rica, Panama
- Cryosophila kalbreyeri (Dammer ex Burret) Dahlgren - Colombia, Panama
- Cryosophila macrocarpa R.J.Evans - Chocó region of Colombia
- Cryosophila nana Blume - Mexico: Sinaloa, Nayarit, Jalisco, Colima, Guerrero, Michoacán, Oaxaca, Chiapas
- Cryosophila stauracantha Heynh. R.J.Evans - Belize, Guatemala, Honduras, Mexico: Chiapas, Tabasco, Campeche, Quintana Roo
- Cryosophila warscewiczii H.Wendl. Bartlett - Panama, Costa Rica, Nicaragua, Honduras
- Cryosophila williamsii P.H.Allen - Honduras

== Distribution and status ==
The genus Cryosophila ranges from central Mexico in the north to northern Colombia in the south. Several species in the genus are endangered, including Cryosophila williamsii which is, according to the IUCN Red List, extinct in the wild. All species are palms of the forest understorey, and nine of the ten species are found in lowland humid or wet forests. The tenth species, C. nana, is a tree of tropical dry forests.
