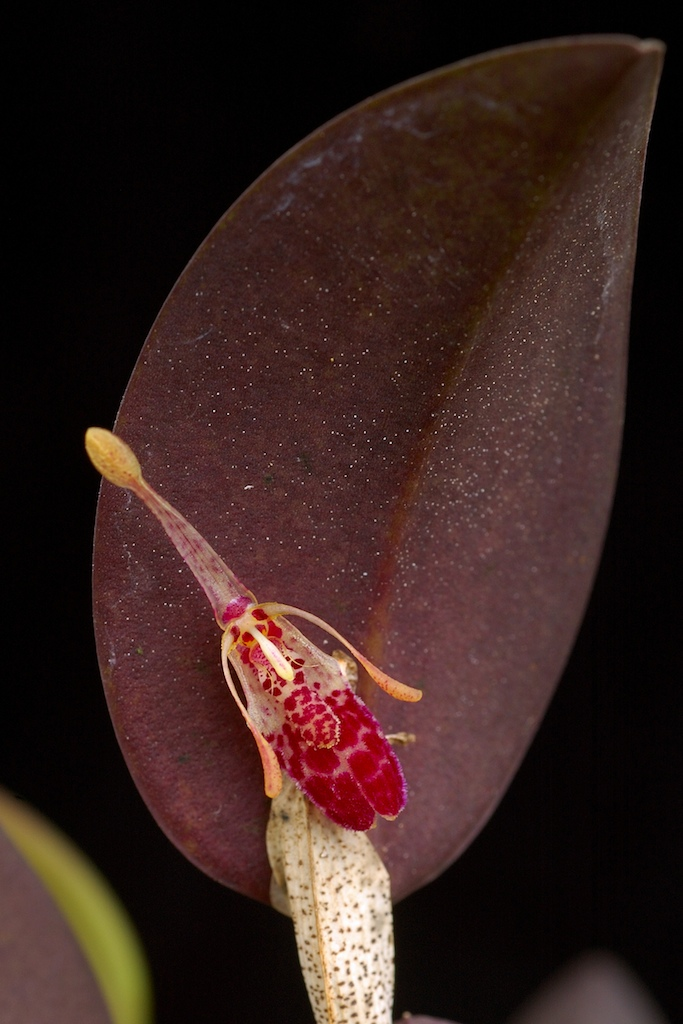

Scientific classification
- Kingdom: Plantae
- Clade: Tracheophytes
- Clade: Angiosperms
- Clade: Monocots
- Order: Asparagales
- Family: Orchidaceae
- Subfamily: Epidendroideae
- Genus: Restrepia
- Species: R. muscifera

Binomial name
- Restrepia muscifera (Lindley) Rchb.f. ex Lindl.

Synonyms
- Pleurothallis muscifera Lindl. (basionym); Restrepia lansbergii Hook.; Restrepia xanthophthalma Rchb.f.; Restrepia dayana Rchb.f.; Restrepia shuttleworthii Rolfe; Restrepia powellii Schltr.; Restrepia tonduzii Schltr.; Pleurothallis xanthophthalma (Rchb.f.) L.O.Williams; Pleurothallis dayana (Rchb.f.) L.O.Williams; Restrepia muscifera ssp. shuttleworthii (Rolfe) H.Mohr

= Restrepia muscifera =

Species of plant

Restrepia muscifera, commonly known as the fly-carrying restrepia, is a species of orchid.

The epithet 'muscifera' is a Latin word, meaning 'fly bearing'. This is an allusion to the appearance of the flower.

It is a tiny cespitose orchid, occurring from southern Mexico to Colombia, and a few scattered spots in Peru, found in tropical and montane rainforests at altitudes between 300 and 2,400 m.

This epiphytic orchid lacks pseudobulbs. The single, erect, thick, leathery leaf is elliptic-ovate in shape. The aerial roots seem like fine hairs.

The flowers develop one at a time at the base of the leaf and reach a length of about 2.3 cm. They are borne on a slender peduncle, originating from the base of the back of the leaf.

The long dorsal sepal is erect, almost translucent white with dark red dots and ends in a somewhat thicker, yellow club-shaped tip, with minute magenta dots. They have fused lateral sepals (synsepals) with a length of about 2.5 cm and a small split at the end.

These are quite colorful: overall almost translucent white, overlaid with contrasting reddish-purple dots in an ovate line pattern. The long, lateral petals also end in a thickened, yellow club-shaped tip.

The shorter, smooth lip is ovate. It shows the same variations of dark red with magenta dots.
