= Herbert R. Schaal =

American landscape architect and educator (born 1940)

Herb Schaal
- Born: Herbert Rudolf Schaal; July 7, 1940 (age 85); Alameda, California
- Occupation: Landscape architect

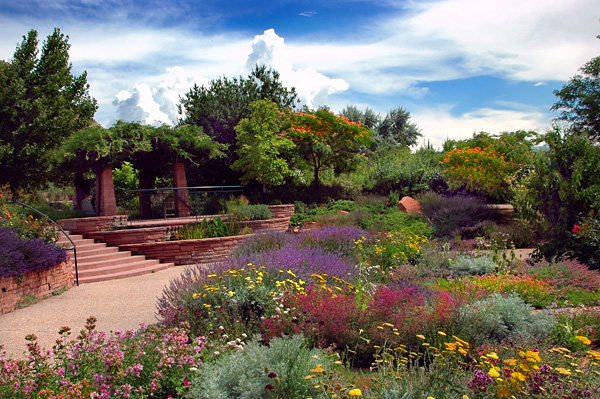
Red Butte Garden

Herbert R. Schaal (born July 7, 1940) is an American landscape architect, educator, and firm leader, notable for the broad range and diversity of his projects, including regional studies, national parks, corporate and university campuses, site planning, botanical gardens, downtowns, highways, cemeteries, and public and private gardens.

Schaal is one of the first landscape architects to design children's gardens, beginning in the 1990s with Gateway Elementary, Gateway Middle, and Gateway Michael Elementary school grounds in St. Louis, Missouri, the Hershey Children's Garden at the Cleveland Botanical Gardens, and Red Butte Garden and Arboretum.

== Early life ==
Schaal grew up in Oakland, California, where he spent many hours in the neighborhood empty lot exploring nature, digging tunnels, and building forts. His connection to nature deepened as a Boy Scout and camp counselor. He was also influenced at an early age by his father, Rudolf J. Schaal, a landscape architect who emigrated from Germany in the 1930s. As a teenager, Schaal accompanied his father to job sites and learned the craft of shaping the ground, building structures, and planting. After high school, Schaal attended California State Polytechnic University, Pomona and received the Bachelor of Science in Landscape Architecture degree in 1962.

== Career ==
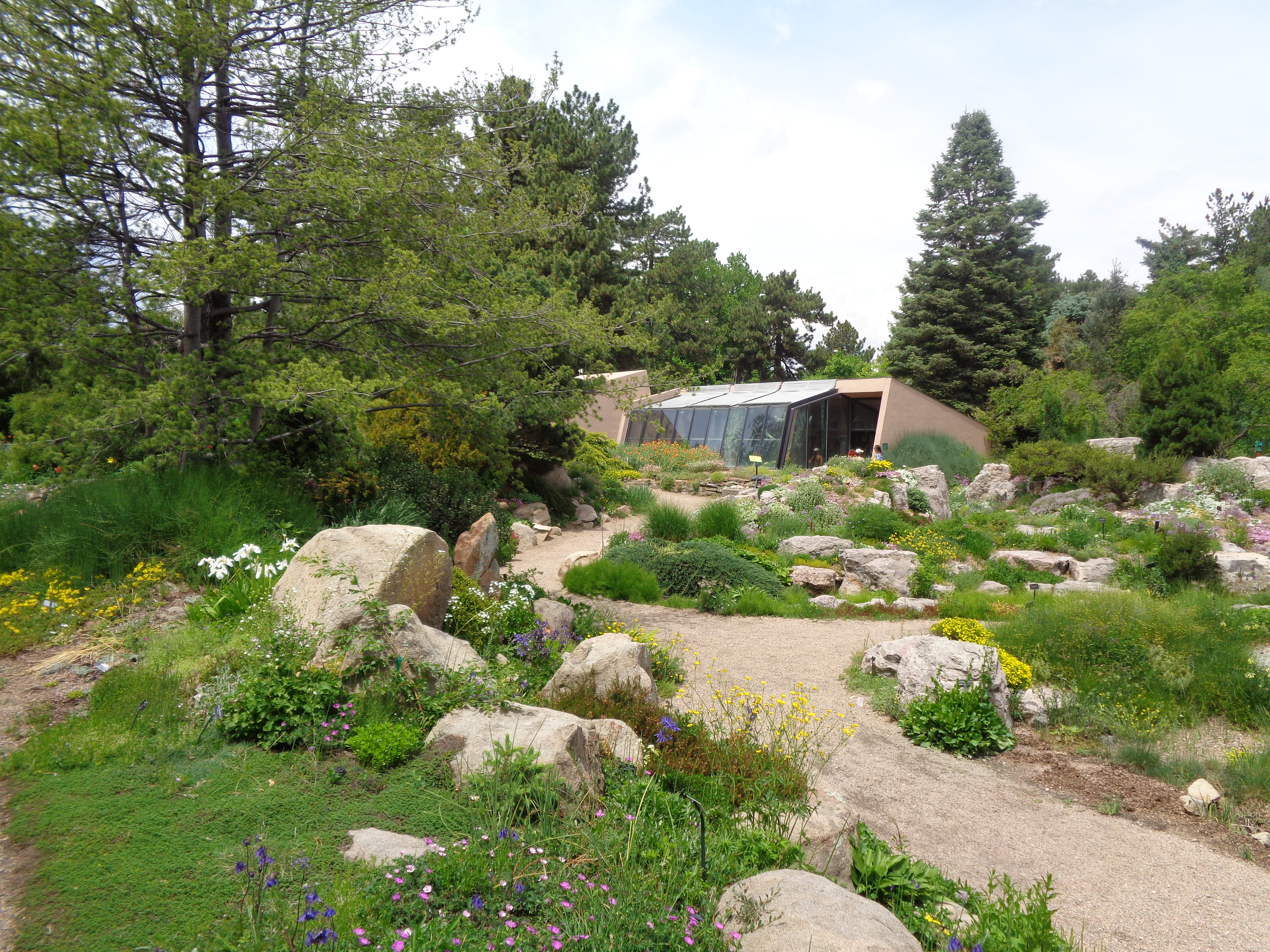
Denver Botanic Gardens

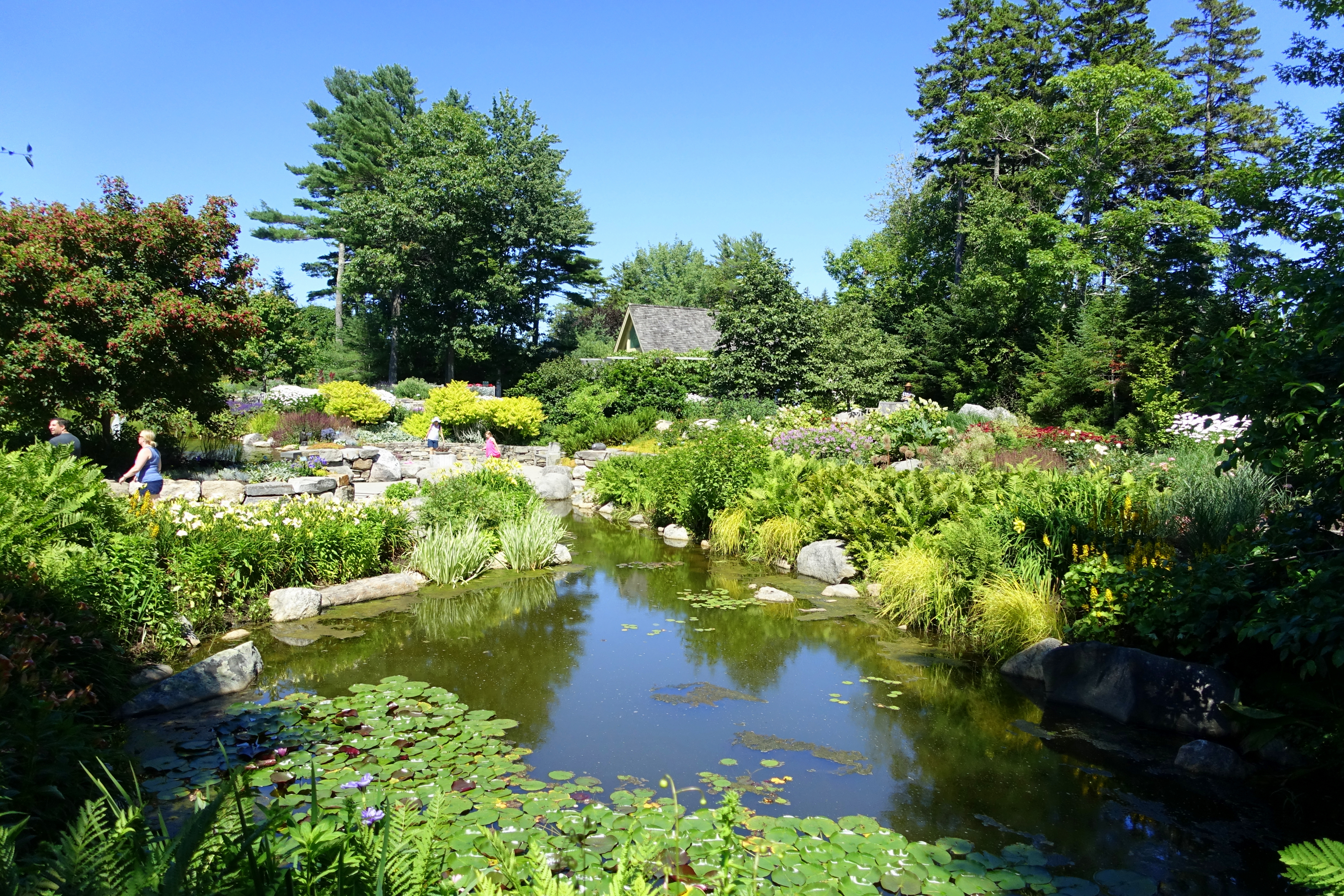
Little pond Coastal Maine Botanical Gardens

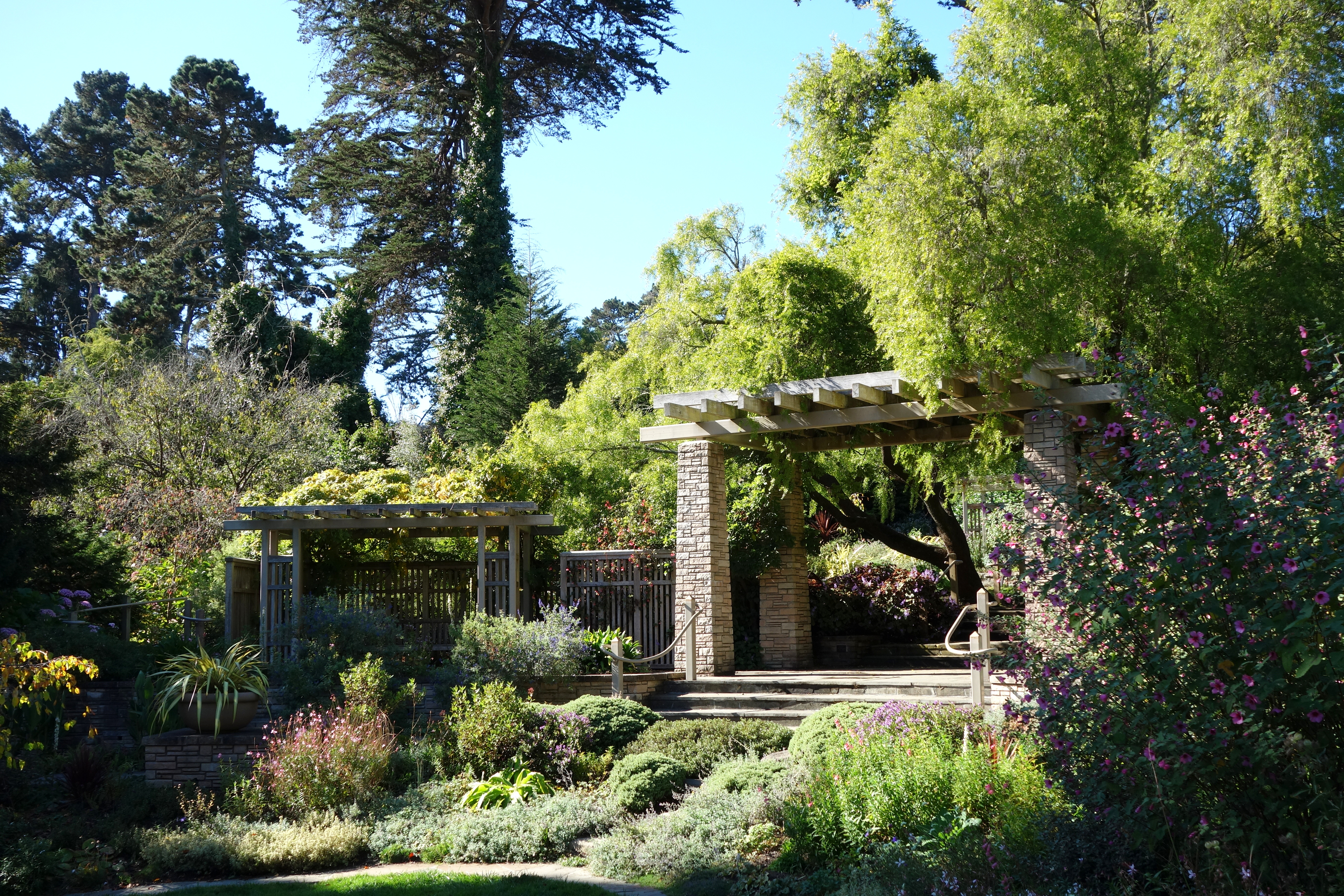
General view - San Francisco Botanical Garden

Schaal's first year of practice was for Kenneth R. Anderson Associates in California. In 1964, he moved to Raleigh, North Carolina to work for his former instructor, Richard Moore. Moore had become the chair of the landscape architecture department at North Carolina State University's School of Design and principal of his private practice office, Megatech.

In 1966, Schaal accepted a full-time teaching position at the State University of New York College of Environmental Science and Forestry, where he earned a master's degree in landscape architecture four years later. He taught design and graphics with an emphasis on using perspective drawing as part of the design process. He developed the “Proportional Method of Perspective Drawing,” which was subsequently taught in American landscape architecture programs. This method is described in Nicholas Dines’ book, Landscape Perspective Drawing, where the author recounts a meeting over coffee with Schaal in the 1970s where Schaal “sketched a one-point perspective depth proportioning system on a table napkin that eliminated the need to project from a measured plan.”

In 1970, Schaal joined the San Francisco office of Eckbo Dean Austin and Williams, later known as EDAW. His first project used geographic information system technology and an association with Jack Dangermond, founder of Esri, to site a power plant and transmission lines for the Pacific Gas and Electric Company (PG&E) Davenport Project near Santa Cruz, California. This project established a new service for the firm which led to many large area siting studies. Schaal was then recognized as an authority on utility siting and later became an associate author of a text book on the subject.

In 1974, desiring a more rural lifestyle for his family Schaal moved to Fort Collins, Colorado, where he acquired the High Meadows Ranch near Rocky Mountain National Park and established EDAW’s Rocky Mountain Office. In 1980, Schaal began providing planning and design services for the Denver Botanic Gardens, including the design of the Alpine Rock Garden, which was recognized by Garden Design Magazine as the “premier example of the art of rock gardening in North America” and national park projects including work for three of the most prestigious parks: Yellowstone National Park, Grand Canyon National Park and Yosemite National Park. During this period, Schaal also established and directed the EDAW Summer Student Program at his High Meadows Ranch, which for over 25 years, recruited promising landscape architecture students from universities to participate in real national and international projects with EDAW principals. The American Society of Landscape Architects recognized the importance of the program in 2000 with the Landscape Architecture Award of Excellence. Under Schaal's guidance EDAW’s Rocky Mountain Office grew to over 40 employees in various disciplines addressing a wide range of award-winning projects, including parks of all scales, zoos, botanical gardens, urban design, trails, waterfronts, highways and streetscapes, office parks, and environmental studies.

Schaal stepped down from overseeing the office in 1988 and concentrated his efforts on sustainable planning and design of university campuses, public gardens, and private estates. During this period, he completed dozens of projects at Washington University in St. Louis. Building on his experience with the Denver Botanic Gardens, he created master plans and designed gardens for over 20 botanical gardens and arboretums nationwide, including the Coastal Maine Botanical Gardens. In the design of children’s environments, Schaal is credited with systematically including all five senses and applying Howard Gardner’s theory of multiple intelligences. Schaal has designed “over 20 unique children’s gardens across the country,” including at the Cheyenne Botanic Gardens, the first public children's garden to be Platinum certified by Leadership in Energy and Environmental Design (LEED); the 4-acre children's garden at Morton Arboretum; and the Olson Family Roof Garden at St. Louis Children's Hospital, a horticultural therapy garden. Schaal's sustainable design work related to estates is typified by projects like Mark Rockefeller’s Eagle Rock Ranch and South Fork Lodge in Swan Valley, Idaho where Schaal was asked “to spearhead long-term improvements and environmental restoration” including “the creation of a submerged wetland wastewater treatment system” adjacent to the Snake River. After EDAW was acquired by AECOM in 2005, Schaal remained as a principal. He continued his work on public gardens including an ambitious master plan and innovative memorial garden design for the 300-acre historic Bellefontaine Cemetery in St. Louis, Missouri.

Schaal retired from AECOM in 2012. The American Society of Landscape Architects has recognized his work with more than 60 regional and national awards. In 2008 Schaal was named Designer of the Year by the American Horticultural Society, which “established him as one of the most acclaimed contemporary landscape architects.” His work has been characterized by evocative drawings, on-site collaborative workshops, orderly assemblies of environmental decision-making factors, attention to sustainability, and sense of place. Schaal's drawings, design and planning reports, publications, and project photography are archived at the North Carolina State University Libraries Special Collections Research Center.

== Family ==
Schaal married Cynthia J. Lechner in 1990. He had four children from his previous marriage to Diane E. Neill.

== Selected projects ==
Campus and Institutional

- Gateway Elementary School, Gateway Middle School, and Gateway Michael School, St. Louis, Missouri, 1993
- Washington University Medical Center, Streetscape Master Plan, St. Louis, Missouri, 1996
- University of Wyoming, Prexy's Pasture, Laramie, Wyoming, 2001
- Washington University in St. Louis, S. 40 Housing, LEED Silver, St. Louis, Missouri, 2010

Cemeteries

- Bellefontaine Cemetery Master Plan, St. Louis, Missouri, 2012
- Wildwood Valley Memorial Gardens at Bellefontaine Cemetery, St. Louis, Missouri, 2012

Children's Gardens

- Cleveland Botanical Gardens, Hershey Children's Garden, 1998
- Morton Arboretum, Children's Discovery Center, Chicago, Illinois, 2002
- Naples Botanical Garden, Children's Garden, Naples, Florida, 2006
- Cheyenne Botanic Gardens, Paul Smith Children's Garden, 2006
- Coastal Maine Botanical Gardens, Bibby and Harold Alfond Children's Garden, 2009

Corporate Facilities

- Rocky Mountain Energy Company Office Park, Broomfield, Colorado, 1980
- Hewlett-Packard Facilities, Fort Collins, Colorado and Loveland, Colorado, 1981
- Agilent Technologies, Loveland, Colorado, 2008

Healing and Contemplative Gardens

- Denver Botanic Gardens, Morrison Horticultural Therapy Demonstration Garden, Denver, Colorado, 1984
- St. Louis Children's Hospital, Olson Family Garden Terrace Roof Garden, St. Louis, Missouri, 1998
- VCU Massey Cancer Center, Richmond, Virginia, 2005

Land Planning

- Sea Ranch, Final Phase Development Plans, Northern California, 1972
- Phantom Canyon, 10,000-acre Rural Subdivision Master Plan, Northern Colorado, 1985
- Tyson Research Center, 2,000-acre Management Plan, St. Louis, Missouri, 2001

Major Siting Studies

- Pacific Gas and Electric Company (PG&E) Davenport, 285-square-mile Transmission Line Siting Study, Santa Cruz Mountains, California, 1971
- Project Sanguine, 22,500-square-mile Naval Facilities Engineering Command (NAVFAC) Siting Study, Upper Peninsula, Michigan and Central Texas, 1973
- Rawhide Power Plant, 3,000-square-mile Siting Study, Northern Colorado, 1978

Municipal Parks

- Sunset Ridge Park, Westminster, Colorado, 1984
- Addenbrooke Park, Lakewood, Colorado, 1987
- Highlands Ranch Civic Green Park, Highlands Ranch, Colorado, 1999

Public Gardens

- Denver Botanic Gardens, Alpine Rock Garden, Denver, Colorado, 1981
- AmeriFlora '92 Entry Plaza, Columbus, Ohio, 1990
- Red Butte Garden and Arboretum, Terrace Gardens, Salt Lake City, Utah, 1995
- San Francisco Botanical Garden, Zellerbach Garden of Perennials redesign, San Francisco, California, 2001
- Coastal Maine Botanical Gardens, Central Gardens Master Plan, Boothbay, Maine, 2004
- Smithgall Woodland Garden Master Plan, Gainesville, Georgia, 2012

Regional, State, and Federal Parks

- Yellowstone National Park and Grand Canyon National Park, Siting Studies and Native Landscape Restoration Projects, 1979, 1983, 1986
- Blue Mountains National Park Concept Plans for Echo Point, Katoomba, New South Wales, Australia, 1994
- Yosemite National Park, Park Wide Campgrounds Study, California, 2002
- Mount St. Helens National Volcanic Monument Visitor Centers, Oregon, 2003

Residential

- Bruce & Martha Clinton Residence, Mount Thomas, Colorado, 2005
- Mark Rockefeller’s 4000-acre Eagle Rock Ranch, Swan Valley, Idaho, 2006
- Pond Bank House, Cherry Hills Village, Colorado, 2011

Restoration

- Love Greenway, Englewood, Colorado, 1988
- Clear Creek (Colorado) 1/4-mile Creekside Restoration, Denver, Colorado, circa 2000

Sustainable Design

- Concordia Resort Sustainable Master Plan, Virgin Islands, 1995
- Alberici Group Headquarters LEED Platinum Landscape Concepts, St. Louis, Missouri, 2003
- Washington University in St. Louis, Earth and Planetary Sciences, LEED Gold, St. Louis, Missouri, 2010

Trails

- Colorado State Trails Master Plan, Colorado, 1981
- Cheyenne Greenway 15-mile-long Bikeway Plan, Cheyenne, Wyoming, 1992
- Loveland Basin to Bakerville 5-mile-long mountain bike trail on Clear Creek near the Eisenhower Tunnel, Colorado, 1995

Transportation

- Interstate 25 (I-25) Freeway 11-mile Landscape Study, Pueblo, Colorado, 1983
- 15 miles of interstate freeway through Colorado Springs, Colorado, 1990

Visual Analysis

- Pacific Gas and Electric Company (PG&E) Visual Impact Methodology for Transmission Lines, California, 1974
- Rawhide Power Plant north of Fort Collins, Colorado, 1978

Urban Design

- Fort Collins Downtown Development Project, Fort Collins, Colorado, 1975
- Loveland Civic Center, Loveland, Colorado, 1987

Zoological Parks

- Navajo Nation Zoological and Botanical Park, Window Rock, Arizona, 1985
- Cheyenne Mountain Zoo Asian Highlands, Colorado Springs, Colorado, 1993
- Caldwell Zoo Children's Park Plan and Entry, Tyler, Texas, 2005

== Selected awards ==
- California State Polytechnic University, Pomona, Outstanding Graduate in Landscape Architecture, 1962
- Award of Merit, American Society of Landscape Architects, Davenport Studies, 1972
- Award of Honor, American Society of Landscape Architects, Creating Land for Tomorrow, 1979
- Award of Merit, American Society of Landscape Architects, Colorado State Trails Master Plan, 1981
- Award of Merit, American Society of Landscape Architects, Hewlett-Packard Fort Collins, 1981
- Award of Merit, American Society of Landscape Architects, Alpine Rock Garden, Denver Botanic Gardens, 1983
- Award of Merit, American Society of Landscape Architects, Rocky Mountain Energy Company Headquarters, 1983
- President's Award, Colorado Chapter ASLA, Interstate 25 Pueblo Landscape Master Plan, 1984
- President's Award, Colorado Chapter ASLA, Morrison Horticultural Demonstration Center, Denver Botanic Gardens, 1985
- Merit Award, Colorado Chapter ASLA, AmeriFlora '92 Entry, 1992
- Award for Outstanding Example of Western Planning Ethic, Colorado Chapter ASLA, Planning the Green Zone, 1994
- Award of Honor, American Horticultural Therapy Association, Morrison Horticultural Demonstration Center, Denver Botanic Gardens, 1995
- Merit Award, American Society of Landscape Architects, Terrace Garden at Red Butte Garden and Arboretum, 1999
- Merit Award, American Society of Landscape Architects, Gateway Elementary, Gateway Middle, and Gateway Michael Schools, Educational Garden, 2000
- Landscape Architecture Award of Excellence, American Society of Landscape Architects, EDAW Summer Student Program, 2000
- Tucker Award of Excellence, Terrace Garden at Red Butte Garden and Arboretum, 2001
- President's Award of Excellence, Colorado Chapter ASLA, Fort Collins Community Horticulture Center Master Plan, 2001
- President's Award, Colorado Chapter ASLA, Lena Meijer Children's Garden Master Plan, 2002
- Merit Award, American Society of Landscape Architects, Mount St. Helens National Volcanic Monument, United States Forest Service, 2005
- President's Award of Excellence, Illinois Chapter ASLA, Morton Arboretum Children's Garden, 2006
- President's Award of Excellence, Colorado Chapter ASLA, Central Gardens Master Plan, Coastal Maine Botanical Gardens, 2006
- Land Stewardship Designation, Colorado Chapter ASLA, Cheyenne Botanic Gardens, Children's Village for Sustainable Living, 2007
- Honor Award, Maryland and Potomac Chapters ASLA, Norfolk Botanical Garden, World of Wonders Children's Garden, 2008
- American Horticultural Society, Landscape Designer of the Year, 2008
- Honor Award for Design, Colorado Chapter ASLA, Coastal Maine Botanical Gardens, Lerner Garden of the Five Senses, 2010
- Merit Award for Design, St. Louis Chapter ASLA, Wildwood Memorial Garden at Bellefontaine Cemetery, 2016

== Publications ==
- “Denver Botanic Gardens Design and Master Plan” The Bulletin, American Association of Botanical Gardens and Arboreta, Vol. 13, No.2 (1979): 45.
- “The Alpine and Rock Garden” The Bulletin, American Association of Botanical Gardens and Arboreta, Vol. 13, No.2 (1979): pp. 45–51.
- The Rose Garden” The Bulletin, American Association of Botanical Gardens and Arboreta, Vol. 13, No.2 (1979): 51.Siting of Major Facilities (associate author, 1983): ISBN 978-0070704206
- “In the Overall Design of Private Gardens” Rocky Mountain Alpines (1986): 256 ISBN 978-0600307433
- “Disturbed Landscapes” Time-Saver Standards for Landscape Architecture, Second Edition (1998): 640 ISBN 978-0070170278
- “A Place of Solace: Massey Cancer Center Healing Garden” Journal of Chinese Landscape Architecture, Vol. 31, No. 1 (2015): pp. 24–29.
