= Cheyenne Botanic Gardens =

Botanic gardens in Cheyenne, Wyoming, US

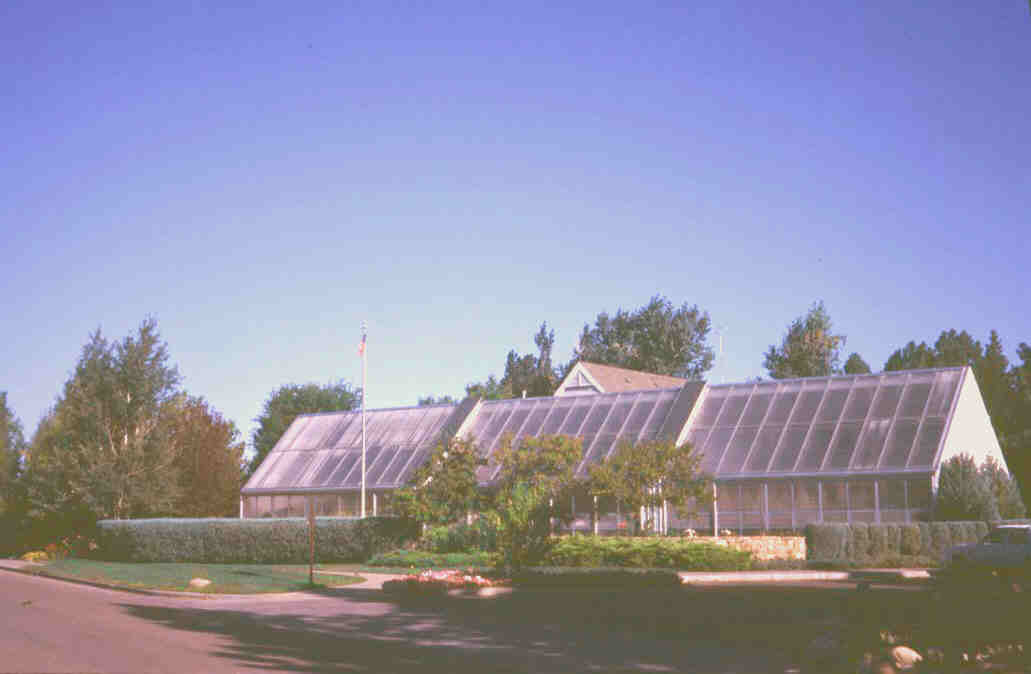
- The Solar Conservatory in 2006
- Interactive map of Cheyenne Botanic Gardens
- Location: 710 S. Lions Park Drive, Cheyenne, Wyoming, U.S.
- Coordinates: 41°09′20.7″N 104°49′50″W
- Opened: 1977
- Website: www.botanic.org

The Cheyenne Botanic Gardens (9 acres, 3.6 ha) are located in Lions Park in Cheyenne, Wyoming, with an associated High Plains Arboretum located five miles (8 km) northwest of Cheyenne at an elevation of 6,200 feet (1,900 m). The gardens began as a vision in 1977 to build a non-profit, solar heated greenhouse. The gardens moved to its current location in 1987. The 6,800 square foot (630 m^{2}) conservatory consists of three greenhouses.

== History ==
The Cheyenne Botanic Gardens originally began in 1977 as the Cheyenne Community Solar Greenhouse. It was formed by the Community Action of Laramie County, Inc. and would also be used as a food bank. The gardens opened that same year. The gardens originally opened with three units forming the greenhouse, all of which used solar energy. The Cheyenne Community Solar Greenhouse moved to its current location in 1987. That same year, the gardens re-branded to the Cheyenne Botanic Gardens. In 1993, the non-profit organization Friends of the Gardens was formed to help fund expansion.

== Design ==
=== Paul Smith Children's Village ===
The Paul Smith Children's Village is located adjacent to the West of the Cheyenne Botanic Gardens. The village opened in 2009 following a year of construction. The village includes several interactive landscapes which include natural wetlands, water works, solar pumps, sculptures, a world vegetable garden and prairie paintings. It was named for Paul Smith and was designed by Herbert R. Schaal.

=== Shane Smith Grand Conservatory ===
Shane Smith Grand Conservatory is directly adjacent to the main gardens and opened in 2017. The conservatory is three stories tall and is named for Shane Smith.

=== The High Plains Arboretum ===
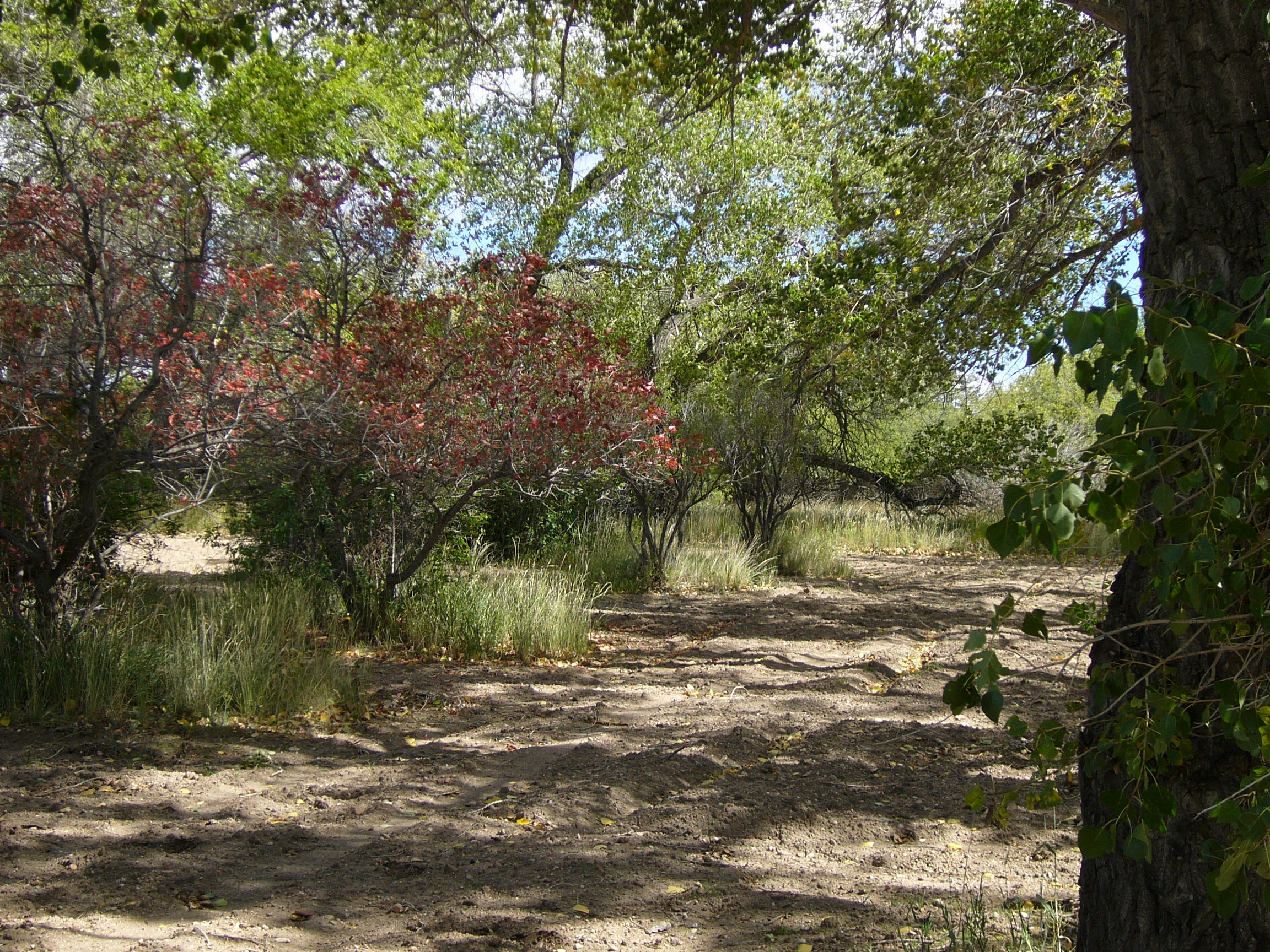
High Plains Arboretum

The High Plains Arboretum operates as part of the Cheyenne Botanic Gardens and is located at the former High Plains Horticulture Research Station. This station was established on March 19, 1928, when Congress authorized the Secretary of Agriculture to establish the Central Great Plains Field Station at or near Cheyenne. In 1930, the site officially became the Cheyenne Horticulture Field Station, and was directed to concentrate on fruits, vegetables, windbreaks and ornamental plants.

== See also ==
- List of botanical gardens and arboretums in Wyoming
