= List of botanical gardens and arboretums in Wyoming =

This list is intended to include all significant botanical gardens and arboretums in the U.S. state of Wyoming

Name	Image	Affiliation	City
Cheyenne Botanic Gardens			Cheyenne
Williams Conservatory		University of Wyoming	Laramie

== See also ==
- List of botanical gardens and arboretums in the United States
