= Cryosophila bartlettii =

Conservation status
- Data Deficient (IUCN 3.1)

Scientific classification
- Kingdom: Plantae
- Clade: Tracheophytes
- Clade: Angiosperms
- Clade: Monocots
- Clade: Commelinids
- Order: Arecales
- Family: Arecaceae
- Genus: Cryosophila
- Species: C. bartlettii

Binomial name
- Cryosophila bartlettii R.J.Evans

Species of palm

Cryosophila bartlettii is a species of flowering plant in the family Arecaceae. It is a shrub or tree endemic to Panama. It is known from a single location near Lake Alajuela in central Panama, where it grows in lowland rain forest.
