= Cryosophila grayumii =

Conservation status
- Vulnerable (IUCN 3.1)

Scientific classification
- Kingdom: Plantae
- Clade: Tracheophytes
- Clade: Angiosperms
- Clade: Monocots
- Clade: Commelinids
- Order: Arecales
- Family: Arecaceae
- Genus: Cryosophila
- Species: C. grayumii

Binomial name
- Cryosophila grayumii R.Evans

Species of palm

Cryosophila grayumii is a species of flowering plant in the family Arecaceae. It is found only in Costa Rica. It is threatened by habitat loss.
