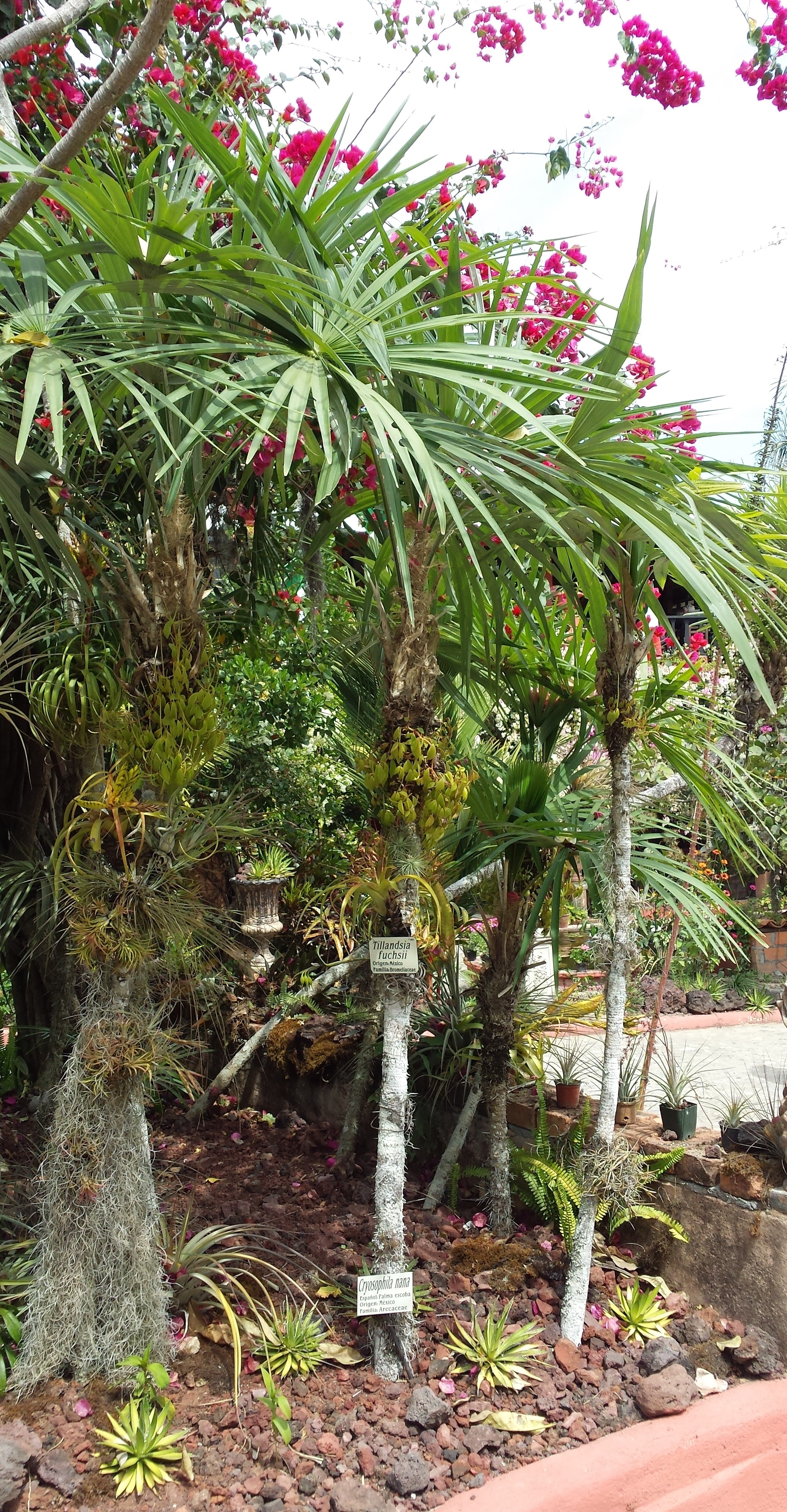
- Crysophila nana at the Vallarta Botanical Gardens with Tillandsias growing along the trunks

Conservation status
- Near Threatened (IUCN 2.3)

Scientific classification
- Kingdom: Plantae
- Clade: Tracheophytes
- Clade: Angiosperms
- Clade: Monocots
- Clade: Commelinids
- Order: Arecales
- Family: Arecaceae
- Genus: Cryosophila
- Species: C. nana

Binomial name
- Cryosophila nana (Kunth) Blume ex Salomon

= Cryosophila nana =

Species of palm

Cryosophila nana is a species of flowering plant in the family Arecaceae. It is found only in Mexico. It is threatened by habitat loss.
