= Louis Otho Williams =

- Born: 1908; Wyoming, U.S.
- Died: 1991 (aged 82–83)
- Other name: Otto Williams
- Siglum: L.O.Williams
- Education: University of Wyoming; Washington University in St. Louis
- Known for: Editor of American Orchid Society Bulletin, Founder of Ceiba journal, Botany of Central America
- Scientific career
- Fields: Botany
- Workplaces: Field Museum of Natural History
- Author abbrev. (botany): L.O.Williams

Louis Otho (Otto) Williams (1908 – 1991) was a botanist from Wyoming. He received his BA and MA from the University of Wyoming then a PhD from Washington University in St. Louis. He went on to be editor of the American Orchid Society Bulletin. While he was editor the bulletin increased publication frequency from quarterly to monthly and membership in the society grew from 200 to 3,000. During World War II worked in Brazil on the rubber procurement project. For much of the 1950s he lived in Honduras and started the journal Ceiba there. After returning to the US he worked for the Field Museum of Natural History starting in 1960 and from 1964 to 1973 served as departmental chair.

== See also ==
- Cryosophila williamsii
- Williams Conservatory
