= EDAW =

Former landscape architecture and urbanism firm

EDAW was an international landscape architecture, urban and environmental design firm that operated from 1939 until 2009. Starting in San Francisco, United States, the company at its peak had 32 offices worldwide. EDAW led many landscape architecture, land planning and master planning projects, developing a reputation as an early innovator in sustainable urban development and multidisciplinary design.

EDAW is an acronym derived from Eckbo, Dean, Austin and Williams, the names of four of the firm's original partners: Garrett Eckbo, Francis Dean, Don Austin, and Edward Williams. A limited partnership, the firm was bought by the American engineering conglomerate AECOM in 2005, ceasing to exist as a standalone practice in 2009 when it was fully integrated into the company.

== History ==
=== Origins and early history (1939-1980s) ===
EDAW traces its origins to the studio founded by Eckbo and Williams in San Francisco in 1939 to practice landscape architecture and urban design. The practice brought together the design of Eckbo's avant-garde, modernist landscape architecture and Williams' concern for conservation and land management. By 1964, joined by Dean and Austin and Robert Royston, the partners took on a number of important commissions across California and beyond. Projects such as the California Urban Metropolitan Space Plan, commissioned in 1962, were radical in their environmental foresight. Under the tutelage of Eckbo, the practice was responsible for some important modernist works of urban landscape architecture including Tucson Community Center and Fulton Mall (Fresno).

It was in the 1960s where the firm expanded into resort and leisure design with its first resort project, the Mauna Kea Beach Hotel in Hawai'i; the firm's international portfolio began with projects in Asia such as Lodi Gardens in New Delhi, India. By the early 1970s, EDAW entered into the environmental planning field with a major commission with the Californian utility Pacific Gas & Electric and undertook a land use review for the State of Hawai'i in 1970. In 1973, the firm – then called Eckbo, Dean, Austin and Williams – adopted the name EDAW.

=== Global landscape architect (1980s-2000s) ===
In the 1980s, the firm expanded its Asian portfolio with projects in Korea, China, Japan, Thailand and Singapore, and by 1992, EDAW had opened offices in Sydney and London. Important commissions in the decade included the Alpine and Rock Garden at Denver Botanic Gardens, the Jimmy Carter Library and Museum in Atlanta and the master plan for Mission Bay, San Francisco. Landscape architect Joe Brown took the reins of the company as president in 1992. Brown, the lead designer of projects Memorial to the 56 Signers of the Declaration of Independence in Washington, DC to Tokyo Midtown, oversaw EDAW's transformation into a global name in landscape architecture. Major commissions included the Restoration of the Everglades, the Monumental Core Framework Plan for the National Capital Planning Commission in Washington, Atlanta's Centennial Olympic Park, the brownfield development at Stapleton, Denver, Celebration, Florida and the landscape architecture for the National Museum of the American Indian.

In the United Kingdom, EDAW was involved in numerous urban regeneration projects. The firm was lead master planner for Manchester city centre's redevelopment following the 1996 bombing and went on to design Manchester's Piccadilly Gardens. Major urban public realm commissions included London's Royal Victoria Dock, Edinburgh's Quartermile, Sheffield's Sheaf Square, Pier Head and King's Dock, Port of Liverpool, and the redesign of Blackpool's waterfront. Between 2003 and 2005, EDAW led the group that developed the master plan for the site of the successful London bid for the 2012 Summer Olympics.

The practice opened a Hong Kong office in 1996, which would eventually grow to include design studios across the region. Of note in Asia was EDAW's long-standing relationship with the city of Suzhou, where EDAW landscape architects and urban designers completed the master plan and public realm design for the China-Singapore Suzhou Industrial Park, using contemporary design techniques but also incorporating traditional Chinese landscape and horticultural traditions. In a similar vein, the firm designed large urban schemes for rapidly industrializing Chinese cities such as Wuxi Li Lake Parklands and the revitalization of the Hai River in Tianjin. In Australia, it was in Brisbane where the practice's work was particularly prolific with projects such as Roma Street Parkland and South Bank Parklands.

=== Subsidiary of AECOM (2005-2009) ===
In 2005, EDAW's partners agreed to sell their practice to AECOM, but the firm continued to operate as a distinct entity and brand for a few more years. In 2007, British landscape architect Jason Prior became president of EDAW. Under Prior, the practice reached 1,800 staff across 32 offices. The company secured notable master plan commissions for large new urban developments such as Saadiyat Island and Msheireb Downtown Doha and significant landscape architecture commissions for Belfast City Centre, the Port of Los Angeles, Southport Broadwater Parklands in Australia's Gold Coast and New York's World Trade Center and in 2009 was bestowed with the American Society of Landscape Architects (ASLA) Landscape Architecture Firm Award. Later that same year, EDAW ceased to exist as a legal entity as AECOM consolidated its subsidiaries. After 70 years, the practice's brand was retired, and its operations were merged into AECOM.

== Firm chronology ==
- 1939-1945: Eckbo & Williams
- 1945-1953: Eckbo, Royston & Williams
- 1953-1973: Eckbo, Dean, Austin & Williams
- 1973-2009: EDAW
