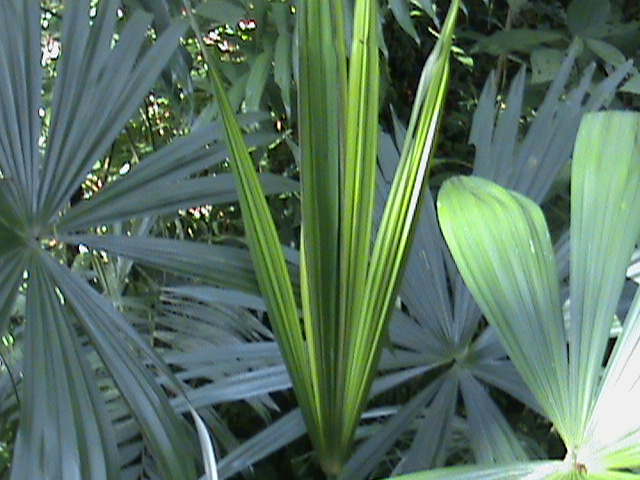

Conservation status
- Critically Endangered (IUCN 3.1)

Scientific classification
- Kingdom: Plantae
- Clade: Embryophytes
- Clade: Tracheophytes
- Clade: Angiosperms
- Clade: Monocots
- Clade: Commelinids
- Order: Arecales
- Family: Arecaceae
- Genus: Cryosophila
- Species: C. williamsii

Binomial name
- Cryosophila williamsii P.H.Allen

= Cryosophila williamsii =

Species of palm

Cryosophila williamsii, also known as Lago Yojoa palm or root-spine palm, is a species of flowering plant in the family Arecaceae. It is found only in Honduras. It is threatened by habitat loss. Cryosophila williamsii is named in honor of prominent botanist Louis Otho Williams.

The IUCN classified this plant as Critically Endangered, and it is assumed there are 200-270 mature individuals in the wild.

Threats to this species include climate change and selective harvesting for ornamental purposes. The species' habitat has been largely converted to agriculture.

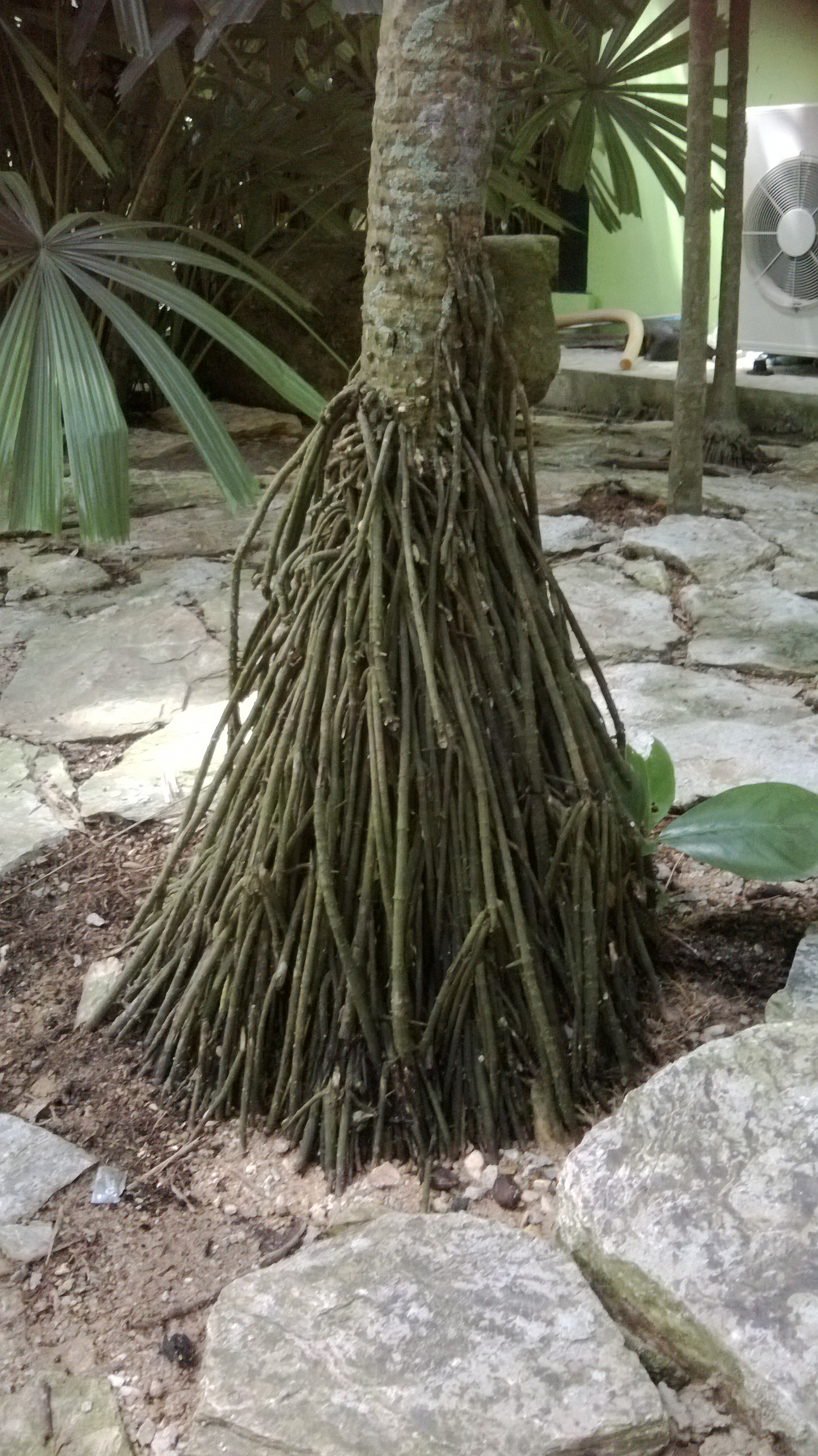
Cryosophila williamsii roots
