= Harley Harris Bartlett =

American botanist (1886–1960)

- H. H. Bartlett
- Born: March 9, 1886; Anaconda, Montana
- Died: February 21, 1960 (aged 73); Ann Arbor, Michigan
- Education: Harvard University
- Scientific career
- Fields: Botany
- Workplaces: University of Michigan
- Doctoral students: Howard A. Crum
- Author abbrev. (botany): Bartlett

Harley Harris Bartlett (March 9, 1886 – February 21, 1960) was an American botanist, biochemist, and anthropologist. He was an expert in tropical botany and an authority on Batak language and culture. The standard author abbreviation Bartlett is used to indicate this person as the author when citing a botanical name.

== Early life ==
Bartlett was born in Anaconda, Montana on March 9, 1886. His family moved to Indianapolis, Indiana in 1899, and he was enrolled in Shortridge High School. It was here where he cultivated his interests in botany, geology, and chemistry. After his graduation, he remained at the school as an assistant in botany and chemistry. Bartlett studied chemistry at Harvard University, receiving his A.B. in 1908. He was brought on as an undergraduate assistant at the Gray Herbarium, working under Merritt Lyndon Fernald and Benjamin Lincoln Robinson.

== Career ==
Bartlett was hired by the Bureau of Plant Industry of the United States Department of Agriculture, where he worked on plant nutrition and biochemistry as well as taxonomy. Inspired by botanist Hugo de Vries, he began publishing on the genetics of the genus Oenothera.

After an invitation from Frederick Charles Newcombe, Bartlett joined the faculty of the University of Michigan in 1915. He made his first collecting trip abroad in 1918 when he was sent to Sumatra with United States Rubber Company to search for high-yielding sources of rubber. In 1919, became director of the University of Michigan's Botanical Gardens, and in 1922, he became head of the Department of Botany. Bartlett served as president of the Michigan Academy of Science, Arts, and Letters from 1924 to 1925, and president of the Botanical Society of America in 1927. He was elected to the American Philosophical Society in 1929.

Bartlett returned to Sumatra in 1927, and became fascinated by the culture and language of the Batak of Asahan. He became a leading authority and an adopted chief of the tribe. He made many collecting trips to South America, as well as in Taiwan, Haiti, and the Philippines. Between 1934 and 1935, Bartlett was an exchange professor at the University of the Philippines. In 1941, Bartlett successfully transported 4,800 Hevea brasiliensis plants to Haiti, helping establish the Société Haitiano-Américaine de Développement Agricole. In 1948, he was named educational consultant for the Philippines in the United States, and a chairman of the Commission on the Philippines. He continued to study rubber production, and introduced high-yielding rubber plants from the Philippines into Haiti and encouraged the cultivation of guayule in parts of South America.

Bartlett retired from the University of Michigan in 1956, but he remained as Professor Emeritus of Botany and Director Emeritus of the Botanical Gardens. Bartlett was the author of 179 publications.

Bartlett died of a heart attack at the age of 73 on February 21, 1960, in Ann Arbor, Michigan.

== Legacy ==
He is commemorated in the name of three genera, Harleya, Bartlettina and Siraitia, and many species, including Anemia bartlettii, Buxus bartlettii, Rhipsalis bartlettii, and Panicum bartletii.

The herbarium at the University of Michigan holds his collections of over 60,000 specimens. In 1955, the Department of Botany established the Harley Harris Bartlett Plant Exploration Fund as a way to finance botanical field trips.
