= International Palm Society =

Non-profit horticulture group focused on palms

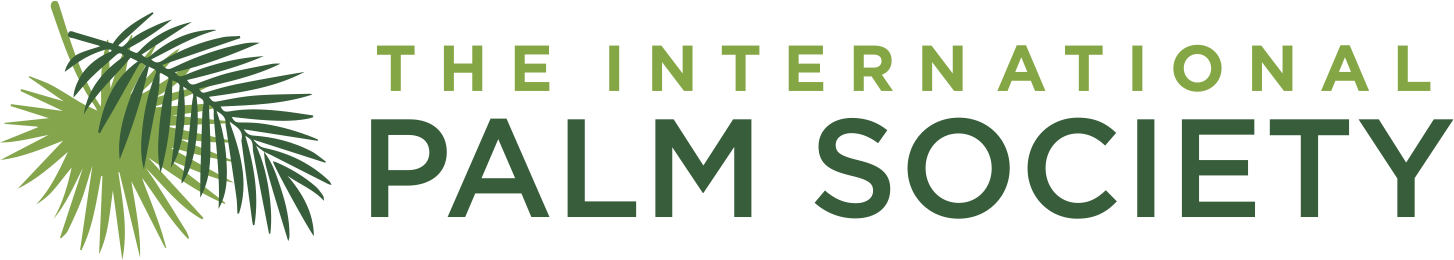
- Formation: 1956; 70 years ago
- Founded at: Daytona Beach, Florida, US
- Type: Horticultural society, 501 (c) (3) nonprofit
- Location: 1401 Lavaca St #751 Austin, Texas, 78701, US
- Members: 4,500 (incl. 33 Benefactors) (2024)
- President: Andy Hurwitz
- Board of directors: 34 (unpaid volunteers)
- Affiliations: 32 local and regional palm societies
- Endowment: $1,053,223 (2024)
- Staff: 1 (2024)
- Website: www.palms.org

The International Palm Society (IPS), formerly the Palm Society, is a horticultural society dedicated to the study of palms, their culture, conservation, and natural history. It was founded in 1956, and has an international membership. It is a nonprofit 501(c)(3) organization. The IPS is known for its publications, grants supporting research, conservation, and education, its conservation initiatives, biennial meetings held in palm-rich localities, and its online interactive forum, PalmTalk.

== Founder and leadership ==
The society was founded by Dent Smith, of Daytona Beach, Florida, who served as the society's first president and editor. The society's first meeting was on Apr. 17, 1956, at Fairchild Tropical Botanic Garden. Smith spelled out his vision for the Palm Society in the first Palm Society Bulletin. He wrote:

The objects of the Society, to be accomplished entirely by means of its publications, would be chiefly to disseminate information about the Palms, both scientific and horticultural, and about any matter or phase relating to them, e.g., their insect pests and diseases, their uses, their relative hardiness, their introduction, their availability as either small or large plants, &c.

The name of the organization changed from the Palm Society to the International Palm Society in 1984.

== Publications ==
=== Journal ===
In 1956, the society began publishing the journal, Principes, on a quarterly basis. The journal was edited by Dent Smith, who by year's end recruited Dr. Harold E. Moore Jr. as the editor. Moore was at that time an associate professor at the L.H. Bailey Hortorium of Cornell University. Moore edited the journal until his untimely death in 1980, after which time, the editorial reins were taken by Drs. Natalie Uhl and John Dransfield. The name of the journal changed from Principes to Palms in 1999 with the publication of volume 43. Uhl stepped down as co-editor in 2000, and the role was taken by Dr. Scott Zona. Dransfield stepped down in 2024, and Dr. William J. Baker took on the role of co-editor. In its 70th volume as of 2026, the journal is full-color, peer-reviewed, and is issued quarterly.

The Society's journal, Principes and its successor, Palms, has been the place of publication for many genera and species of palms described as new to science. Genera described in the journal include Guihaia, Kerriodoxa, Leucothrinax, Satakentia and Wodyetia. Examples of noteworthy species published in the journal include Beccariophoenix alfredii, Marojejya darianii, and a palm with underground flowers, Pinanga subterranea.

=== Books ===
The IPS has published or co-published several reference books related to palms. The first was a partnership with the L.H. Bailey Hortorium to co-publish the first edition of Genera Palmarum, based on the work of H.E. Moore Jr., in 1987.

The society published or co-published other works:

- Chamaedorea Palms, the Species and their Cultivation (1992) by Donald R. Hodel.
- The Palms of Madagascar (1995) by J. Dransfield & Henk Beentje, co-published with the Royal Botanic Gardens, Kew.
- Genera Palmarum ed. 2 (2008) by J. Dransfield, N.W. Uhl, C.B. Asmussen, W.J. Baker, M.M. Harley & C.E. Lewis, published by the Royal Botanic Gardens, Kew "in association with the IPS and the L.H. Bailey Hortorium, Cornell University."

=== Bulletin and Newsletter ===
In 1956, the Palm Society, as the IPS was then known, published monthly Bulletins, which were sent to members. Only six Bulletins were published before they were superseded by the journal. In late 2013, the IPS launched a monthly electronic Newsletter.

== Grants ==
Since its inception in 1985, the IPS Endowment has funded palm research totaling more than $600,000 through the IPS Endowment Awards.

Recently published research that was supported, in part, by grants from the IPS includes:

- Analysis of palm dispersal and diversification rates across the Wallace Line
- A monograph of the genus Hydriastele
- Historical palm biogeography in the Caribbean
- New species of rattan (Calamus) from the Philippines
- Phylogenomic relationships and historical biogeography of vegetable ivory palms (Phytelephas, Ammandra & Aphandra)

Additionally, the annual Sneed Award supports a project that best emulates the curious spirit of Phyllis and Melvin Sneed. The Sneeds were long-time IPS members who traveled the world in search of palms and wrote about their adventures in the pages of Principes.

== Conservation initiatives ==
In 2006, a photo of an unidentified, large, monocarpic, fan palm in Madagascar was posted on PalmTalk, the society's online forum. This photo led botanists to the site and to the discovery and description of a monotypic genus new to science, Tahina, which was published in 2008.

In 2020, the IPS launched its annual Save the Species campaign to raise awareness and funding for targeted palm conservation projects around the world. Save the Species target projects have included:

- 2020 Madagascar: Tahina spectabilis in partnership with Royal Botanic Gardens, Kew.
- 2021 Colombia: Sabinaria magnifica in partnership with SalvaMontes.
- 2022 Hawaii: Pritchardia woodii in partnership with the National Tropical Botanic Garden.
- 2023 UK: Ravenea moorei in partnership with Royal Botanic Gardens, Kew.
- 2024 New Caledonia: Basselinia vestita in partnership with Conservatoire Botanique de Nouvelle Caledonie.
- 2025 Madagascar: Ravenea louvelii in partnership with the University of Antananarivo.

In 2023, the IPS announced International Palm Day to be observed annually on April 17, the birthday of the "Father of Palms," Carl Friedrich Philipp von Martius. The stated purpose of International Palm Day is "to achieve global recognition for not only palm species in jeopardy but also the fragility of palm habitats worldwide."

== Biennial meetings ==
The first meeting of the membership of the Palm Society was held at Fairchild Tropical Garden in Miami, Florida, on April 17 & 18, 1958. Over one hundred members were in attendance. In addition to electing officers and directors, the members were treated to an illustrated lecture "Palms through a Botanist's Eye" by President-elect Dr. Walter H. Hodge. The first biennial held outside of the USA was in June 1972, in Mexico City, Mexico.

Past Biennial Meetings:

- 2002: Southern France
- 2004: Hawaii
- 2006: Dominican Republic
- 2008: Costa Rica
- 2010: Rio de Janeiro, Brazil
- 2012: Thailand
- 2014: Southern Florida
- 2016: Sarawak, Malaysia & Singapore
- 2018: Colombia
- 2020: Réunion Island – Cancelled due to the COVID-19 pandemic
- 2022: Hawaii
- 2024: New Caledonia – Cancelled due to civil unrest
- 2026: Vietnam

== Forum ==
PalmTalk is the popular interactive forum provided by the IPS on which users can post photos and discussions on palm-related topics. The forum has over 1 million posts and over 20,000 registered users.

== Images ==
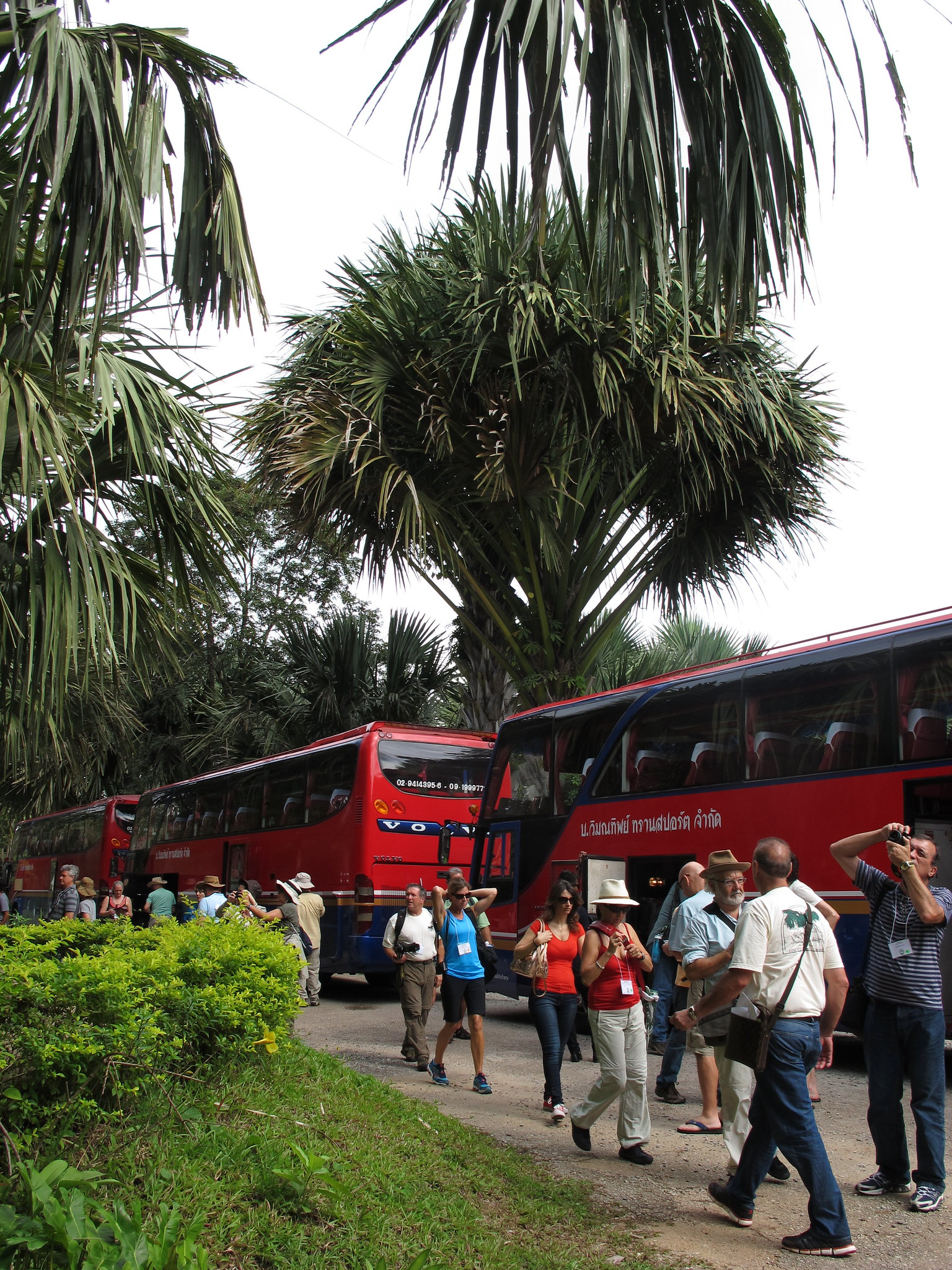
Thap Lan National Park, Thailand. IPS Biennial 2012

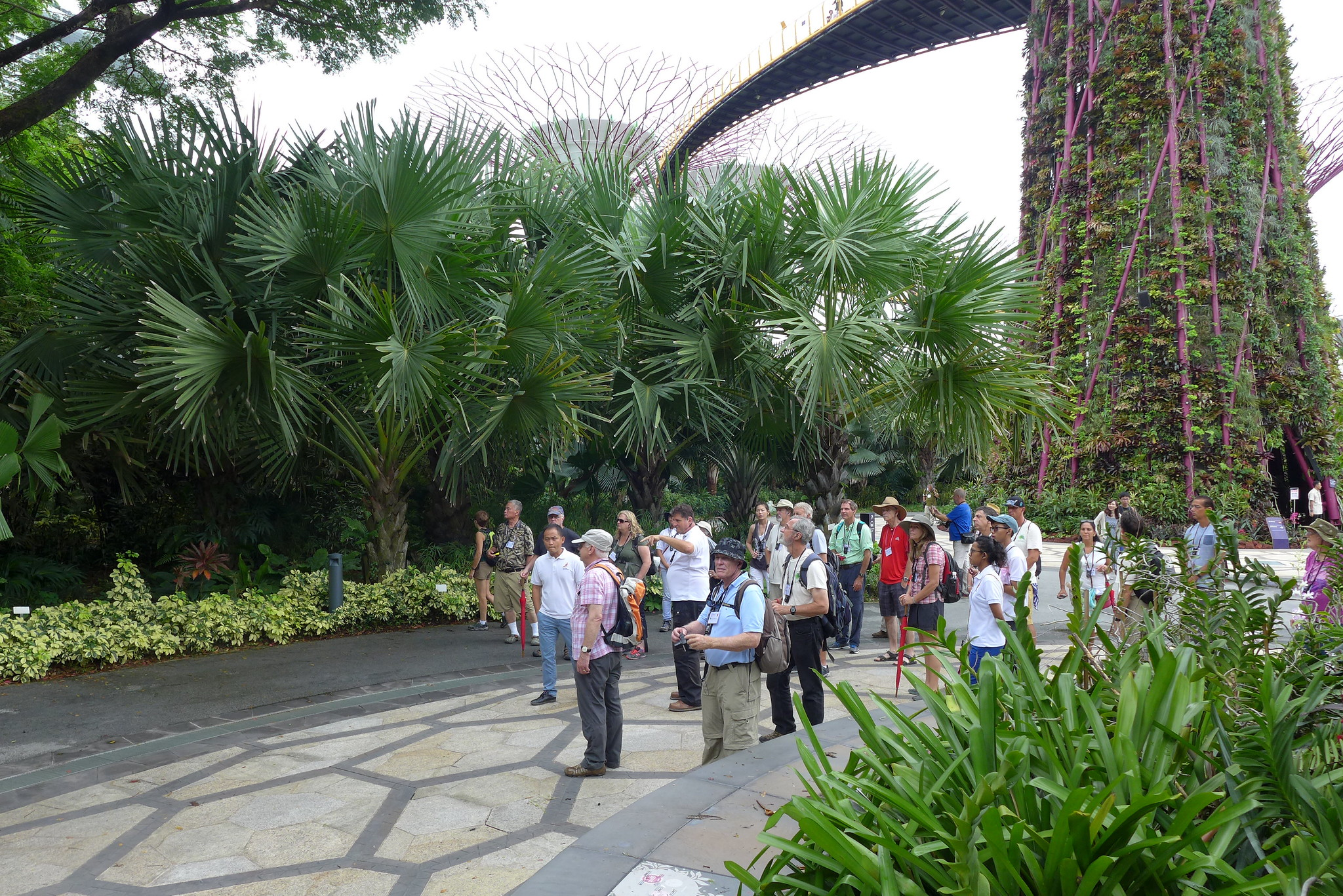
Gardens by the Bay, Singapore. IPS Biennial 2016

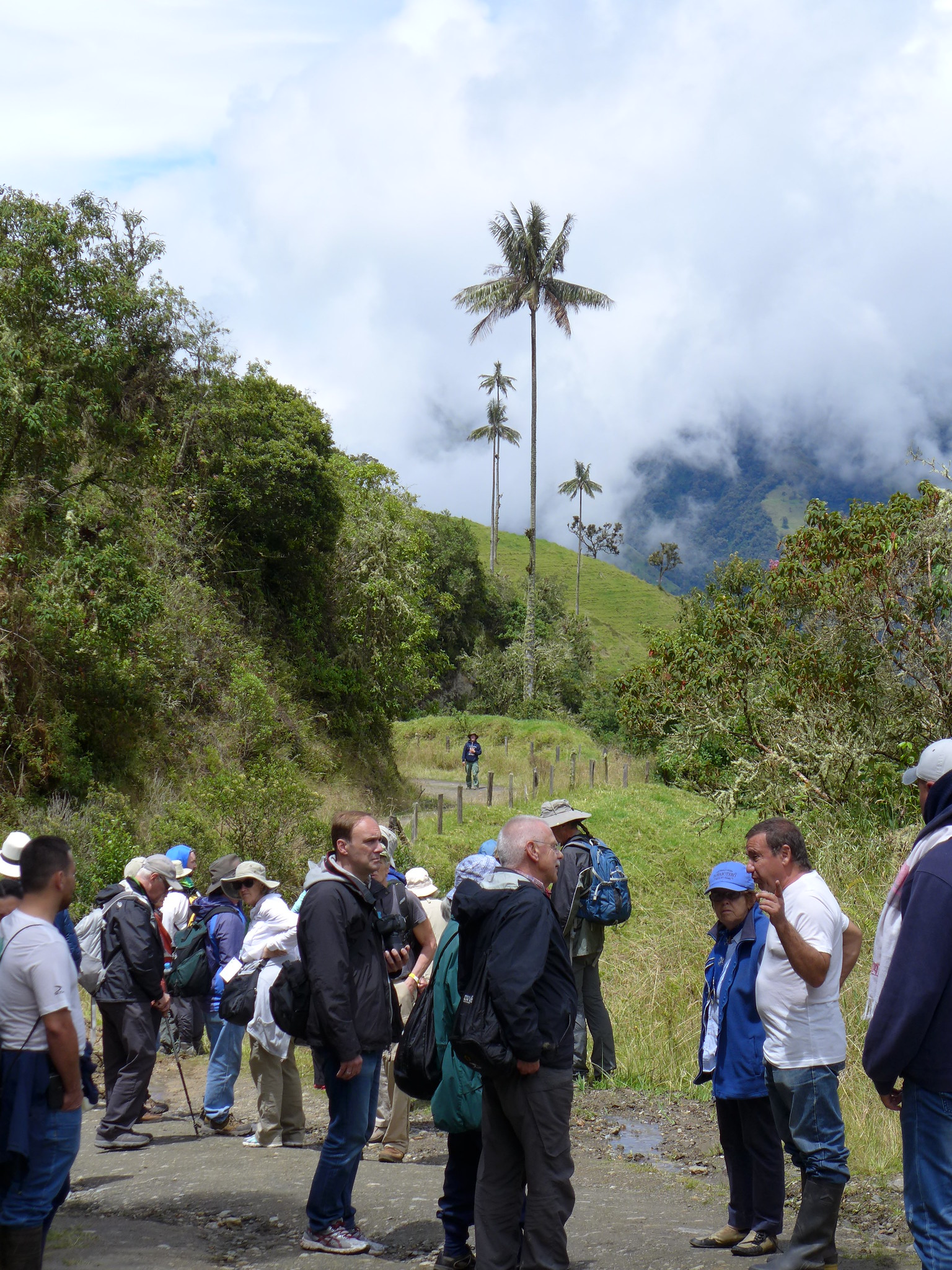
Tochecito, Quindío, Colombia. IPS Biennial 2018

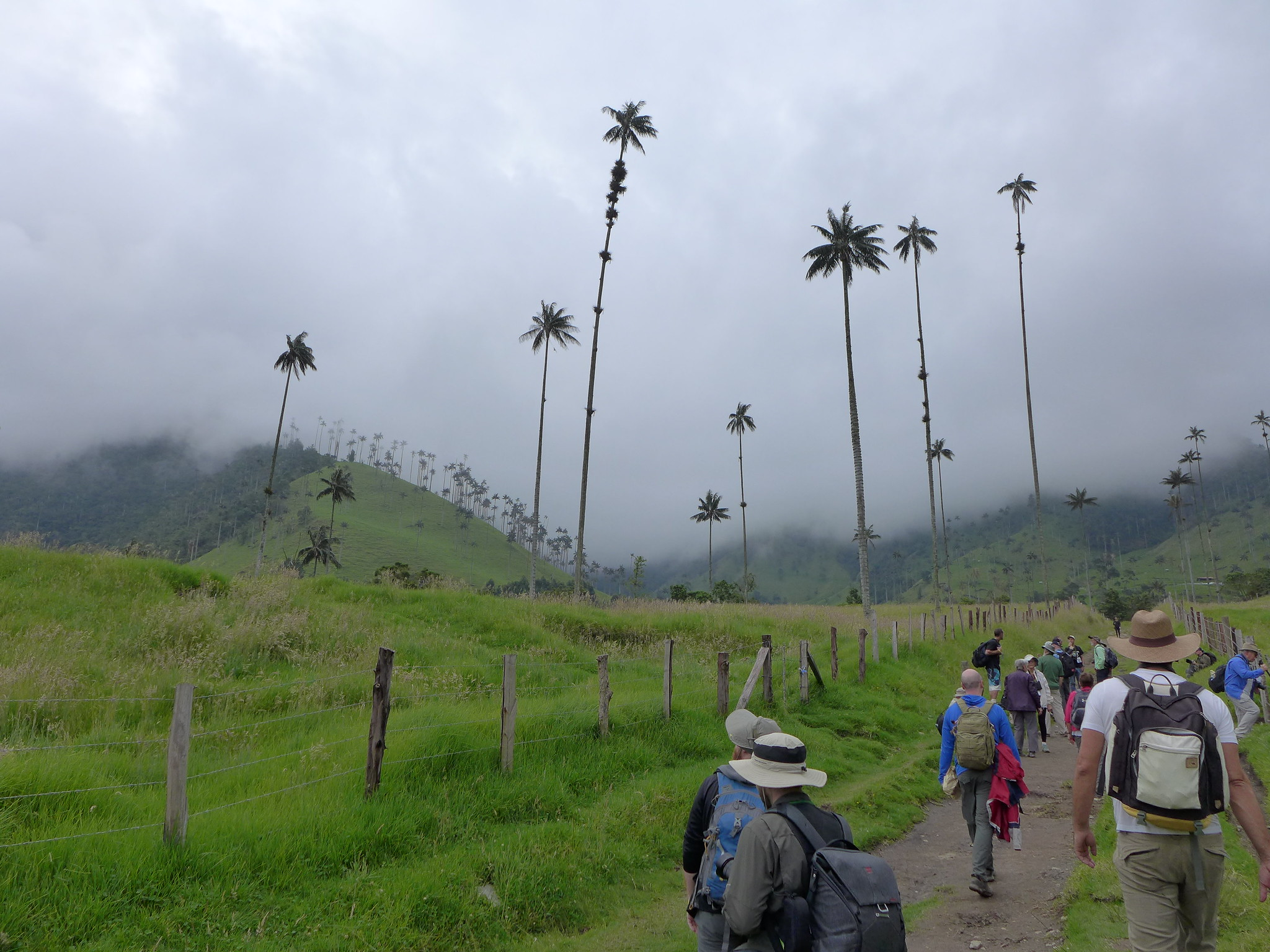
Valle de Cocora, Quindío, Colombia. IPS Biennial 2018.

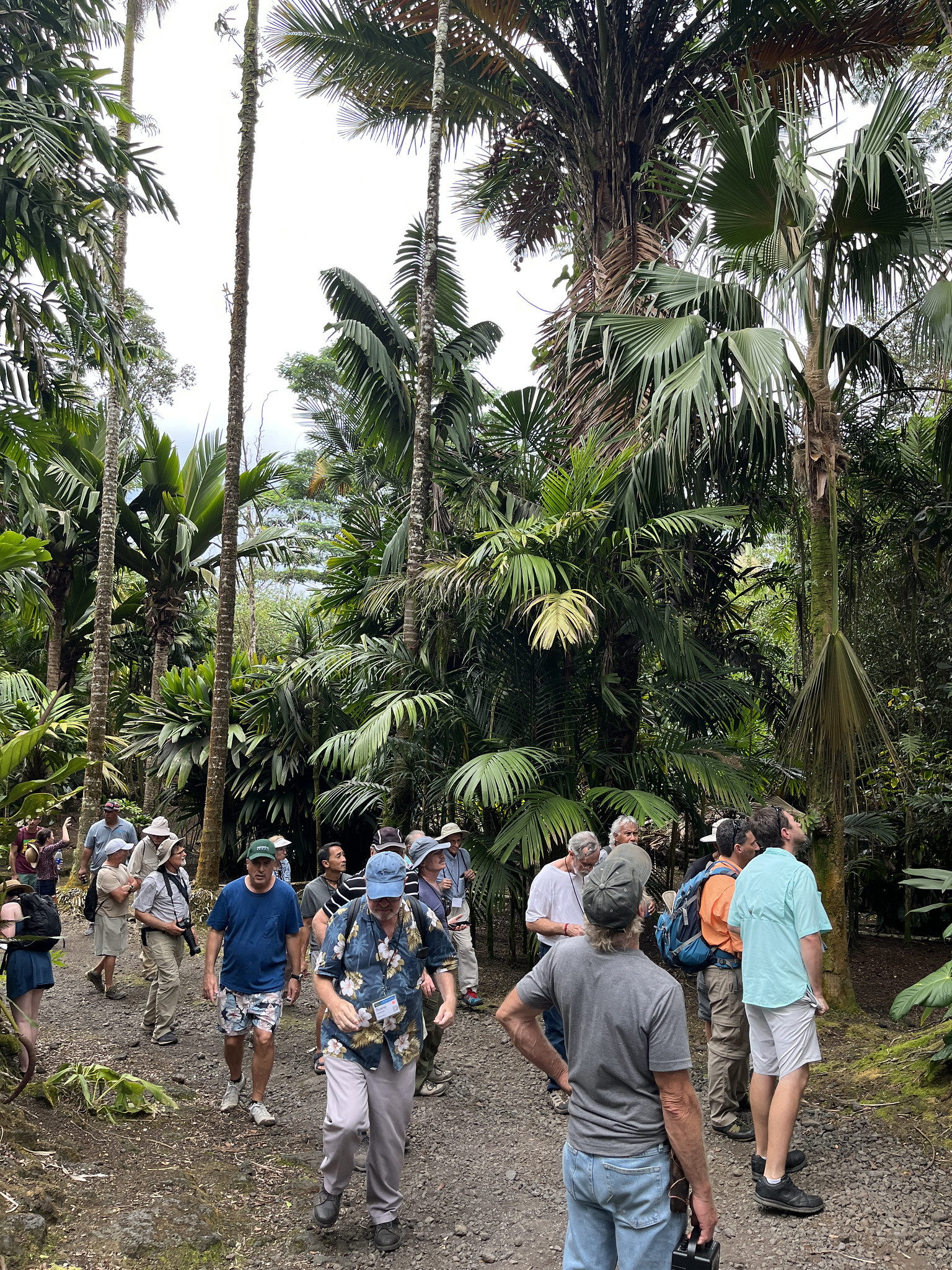
Touring a palm nursery, Hawaii. IPS Biennial 2022

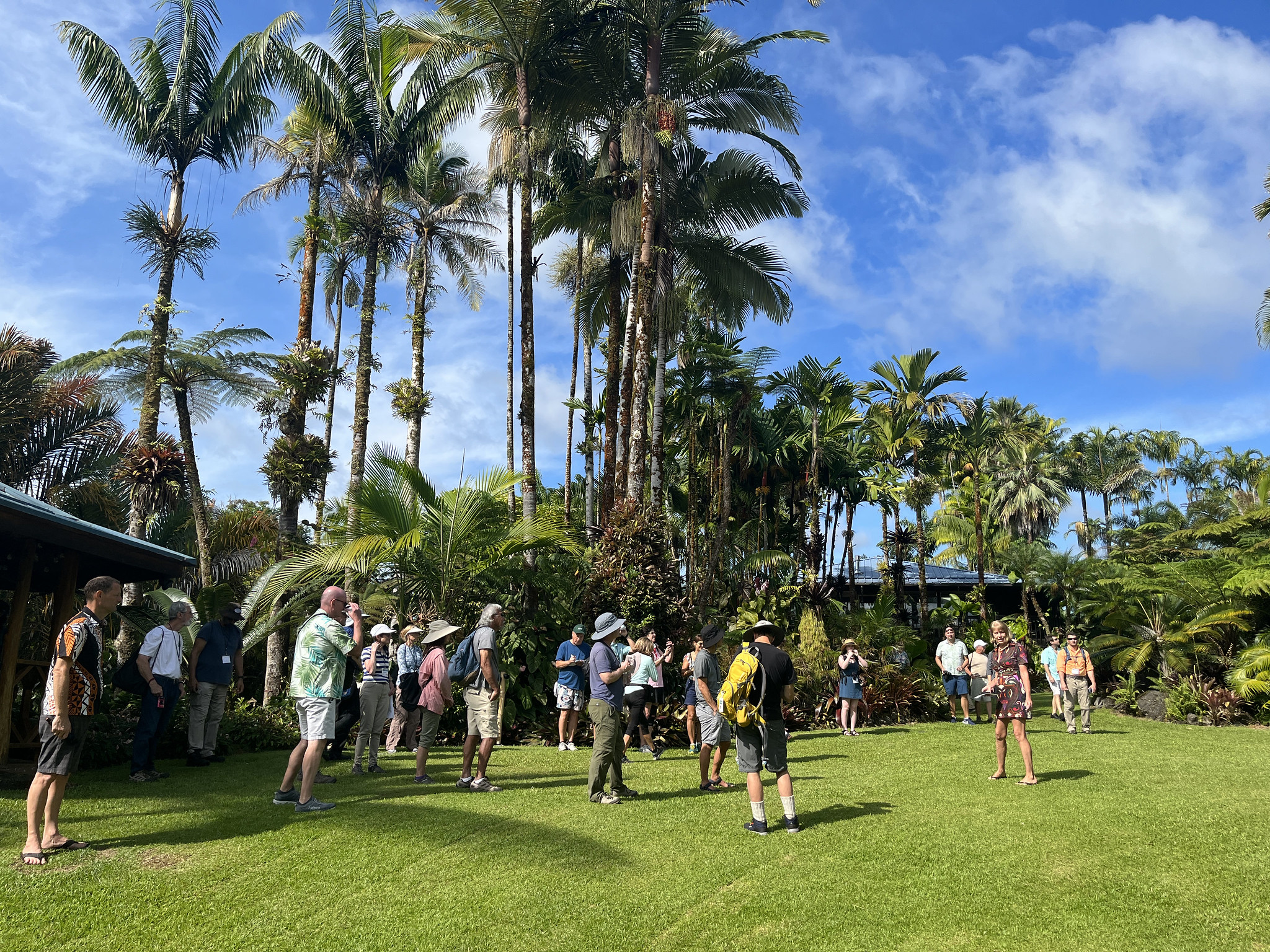
Touring a private garden, Hawaii. IPS Biennial 2022
