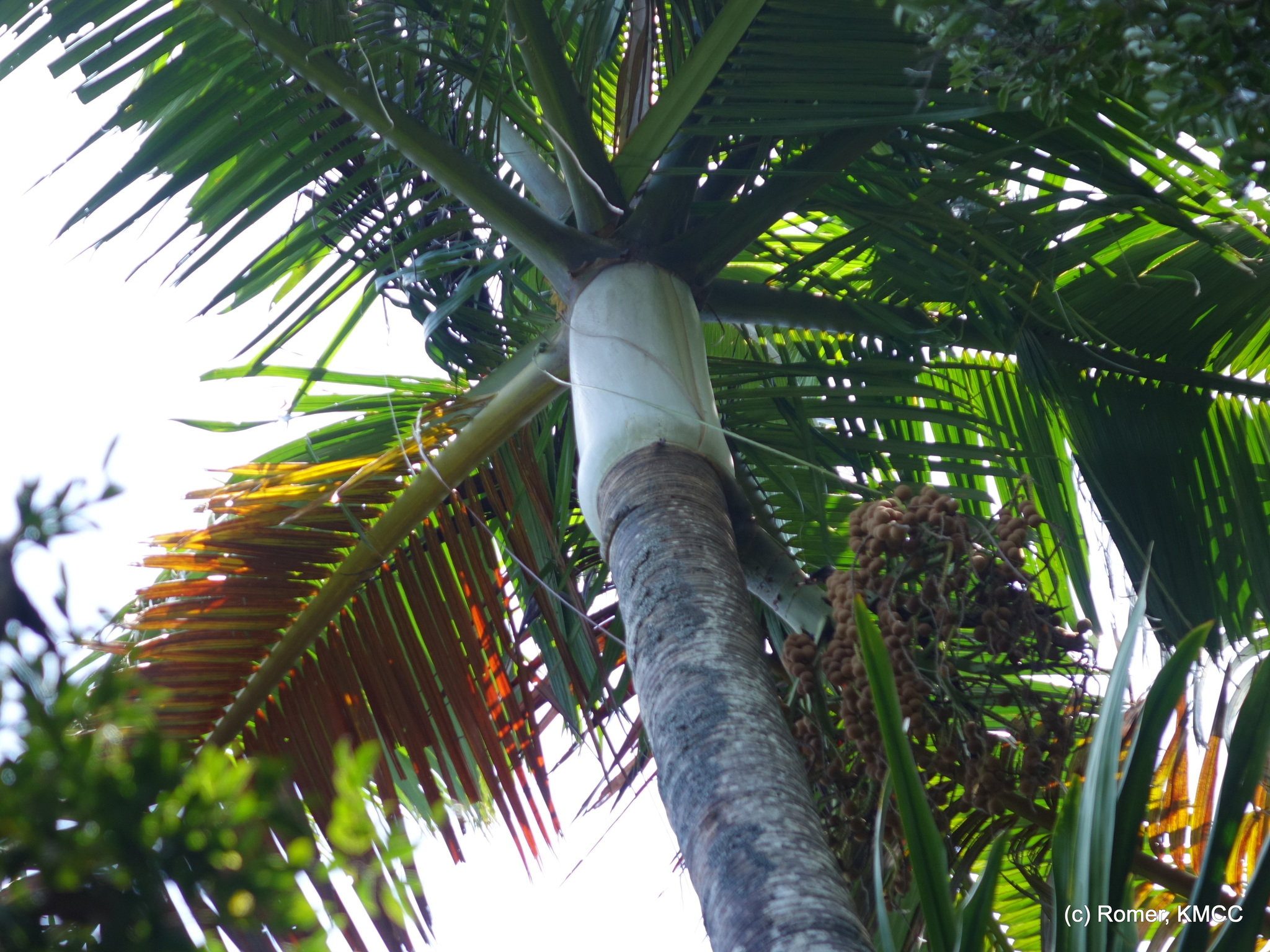

Conservation status
- Endangered (IUCN 3.1)
- CITES Appendix II

Scientific classification
- Kingdom: Plantae
- Clade: Tracheophytes
- Clade: Angiosperms
- Clade: Monocots
- Clade: Commelinids
- Order: Arecales
- Family: Arecaceae
- Subfamily: Arecoideae
- Tribe: Areceae
- Subtribe: Dypsidinae
- Genus: Lemurophoenix; J.Dransf.
- Species: L. halleuxii

Binomial name
- Lemurophoenix halleuxii J.Dransf.

= Lemurophoenix halleuxii =

Species of palms

Lemurophoenix halleuxii, commonly known as red-lemur palm is a species of palm tree which is endemic to northeastern Madagascar. It is an endangered species threatened by habitat loss and overcollection with a population estimate of approximately 300 mature individuals remaining in the wild.

== Description ==
Lemurophoenix halleuxii is a large, single-stemmed palm tree growing up to 20 m (66 ft) tall. The trunk is bare, pale-brown and approximately 1 m (3.3 ft) in diameter towards the base, narrowing to 50 cm (20 in) in diameter further up. It is ringed with leaf scars 10 cm (3.9 in) apart.

Leaves are pinnate and 4–5 m (13–16 ft) long with the crownshaft up to 1.5 m (4.9 ft) long. The leaf stalk is up to 25 cm (9.8 in) long, 25 cm (9.8 in) wide and 5 cm (2.0 in) thick at the base. Each leaf has up to 60 dark-green leaflets on either side of the rachis. Leaflets are linear-lanceolate and approximately 65 cm × 2 cm (25.59 in × 0.79 in) towards the base of the leaf, 95 cm × 6 cm (37.4 in × 2.4 in) mid-leaf and decreasing to 17 cm × 0.7 cm (6.69 in × 0.28 in) at the tip.

== Taxonomy ==
The species was first scientifically described in 1941 by British botanist John Dransfield in the Kew Bulletin journal. The generic name Lemurophoenix is derived from the Malagasy name "hovitra vari mena" which translates to "red lemur palm". The specific epithet halleuxii is named after Dominic Halleux who aided in the scientific discovery of the palm.

== Distribution and habitat ==
Lemurophoenix halleuxii is endemic to the Antongil Bay area northeastern Madagascar, including the Masoala Peninsula and Mananara Avaratra. There are three known subpopulations. The largest is in the Ratanabe area, and there is another in Masoala National Park on the Masoala Peninsula. The species' estimated extent of occurrence is 1,729 km^{2} and its estimated area of occupancy is 31 km^{2}.

It grows in primary humid evergreen lowland forest on steep slopes and in deep narrow valleys, generally between 200–450 metres (660–1,480 ft) above sea level, and occasionally as high as 700 metres (2,300 ft) above sea level.

== Conservation status ==
The red-lemur palm is listed as endangered on the IUCN Red List of Threatened Species due to its restricted range, its small and declining population and loss of habitat for logging and agricultural development. The trees are sometimes cut down for collection of seeds which are used in international horticulture. The entire wild population has been estimated at around 300 mature individuals at the time the IUCN assessment was published in 2012.
