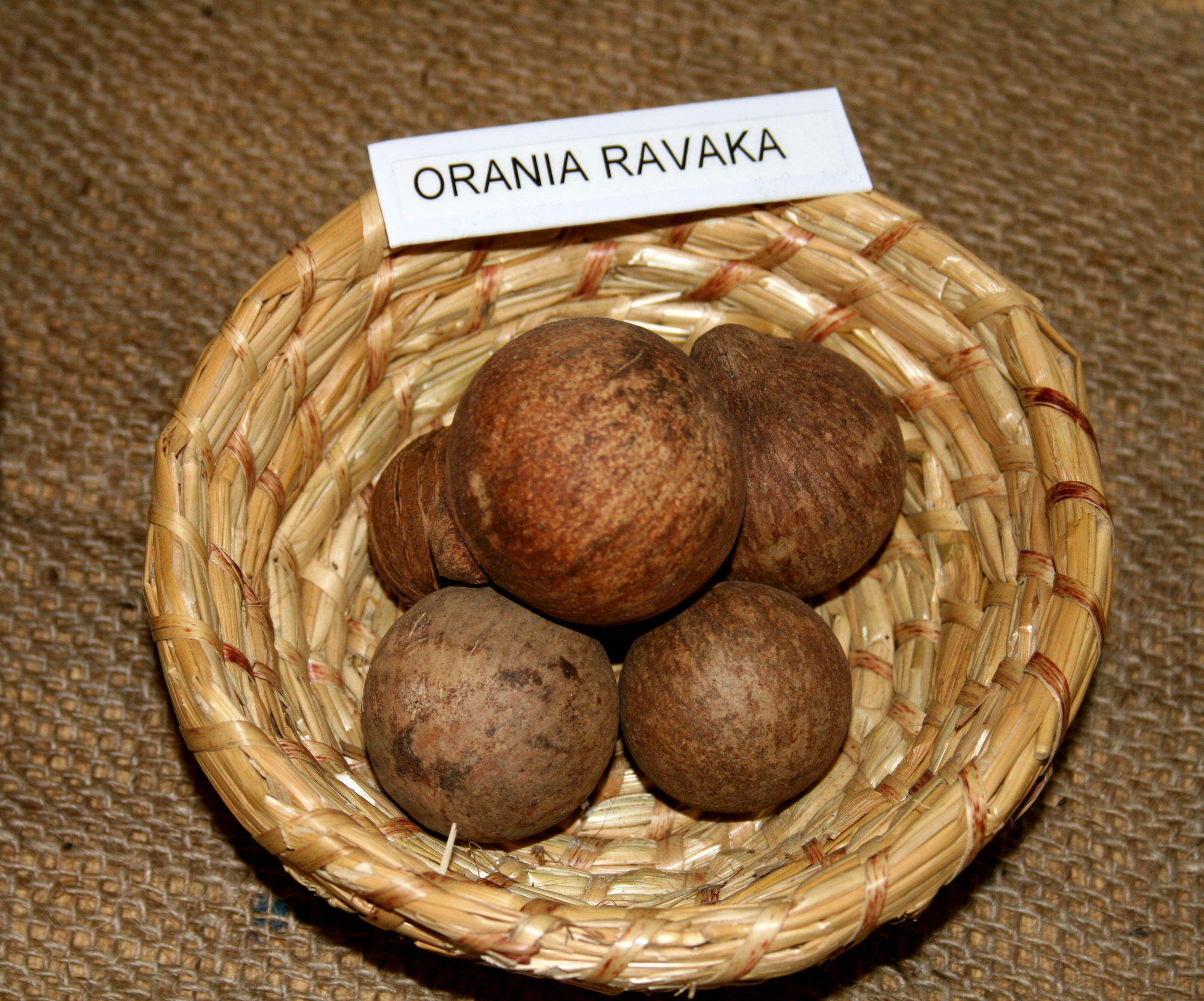
- Orania ravaka

Scientific classification
- Kingdom: Plantae
- Clade: Embryophytes
- Clade: Tracheophytes
- Clade: Spermatophytes
- Clade: Angiosperms
- Clade: Monocots
- Clade: Commelinids
- Order: Arecales
- Family: Arecaceae
- Subfamily: Arecoideae
- Tribe: Oranieae
- Genus: Orania; Zipp.

Type species
- Orania regalis Zipp.

Synonyms
- Halmoorea J.Dransf. & N.W.Uhl; Sindroa Jum.; Arausiaca Blume; Macrocladus Griff.

= Orania (plant) =

Genus of palms

Orania is a genus of the palm family Arecaceae, whose native range is Madagascar, Malesia, and New Guinea.

== Species ==
The following 30 species are accepted by Plants of the World Online as of 24 July 2023

- Orania archboldiana Burret - New Guinea
- Orania bakeri A.P.Keim & J.Dransf. - New Guinea
- Orania dafonsoroensis A.P.Keim & J.Dransf. - New Guinea
- Orania decipiens Becc. - Philippines
- Orania deflexa A.P.Keim & J.Dransf. - Papua New Guinea
- Orania disticha Burret - Papua New Guinea
- Orania ferruginea A.P.Keim & J.Dransf. - New Guinea
- Orania gagavu Essig - New Guinea
- Orania glauca Essig - New Guinea
- Orania grandiflora A.P.Keim & J.Dransf. - New Guinea
- Orania lauterbachiana Becc. - New Guinea
- Orania littoralis A.P.Keim & J.Dransf. - Papua New Guinea
- Orania longisquama (Jum.) J.Dransf. & N.W.Uhl - Madagascar
- Orania longistaminodia A.P.Keim & J.Dransf. - Papua New Guinea
- Orania macropetala K.Schum. & Lauterb. - Papua New Guinea
- Orania micrantha Becc. - Papua New Guinea
- Orania oreophila Essig - Papua New Guinea
- Orania palindan (Blanco) Merr. - New Guinea, Maluku, Sulawesi, Philippines
- Orania paraguanensis Becc. - Sabah, Palawan
- Orania parva Essig - New Guinea
- Orania ravaka Beentje - Madagascar
- Orania regalis Zipp. - New Guinea, Aru Islands
- Orania sibuyanensis (Becc.) Adorador & Fernando - Philippines
- Orania subdisticha A.P.Keim & J.Dransf. - Papua New Guinea
- Orania sylvicola (Griff.) H.E.Moore - Thailand, Malaysia, Borneo, Java, Sumatra
- Orania tabubilensis A.P.Keim & J.Dransf. - New Guinea
- Orania timikae A.P.Keim & J.Dransf. - New Guinea
- Orania trispatha (J.Dransf. & N.W.Uhl) Beentje & J.Dransf. - Madagascar
- Orania zheae Adorador & Fernando - Philippines
- Orania zonae A.P.Keim & J.Dransf. - New Guinea
