= Orania longisquama =

Conservation status
- Least Concern (IUCN 3.1)

Scientific classification
- Kingdom: Plantae
- Clade: Tracheophytes
- Clade: Angiosperms
- Clade: Monocots
- Clade: Commelinids
- Order: Arecales
- Family: Arecaceae
- Genus: Orania
- Species: O. longisquama

Binomial name
- Orania longisquama (Jum.) J.Dransf. & N.W.Uhl

Species of palm

Orania longisquama is a species of flowering plant in the family Arecaceae. It is found only in Madagascar. It is threatened by habitat loss.
