= Orania trispatha =

Conservation status
- Vulnerable (IUCN 3.1)

Scientific classification
- Kingdom: Plantae
- Clade: Embryophytes
- Clade: Tracheophytes
- Clade: Angiosperms
- Clade: Monocots
- Clade: Commelinids
- Order: Arecales
- Family: Arecaceae
- Genus: Orania
- Species: O. trispatha

Binomial name
- Orania trispatha (J.Dransf. & N.W.Uhl) Beentje & J.Dransf.

Synonyms
- Halmoorea trispatha J.Dransf. & N.W.Uhl

Species of flowering plant

Orania trispatha is a species of flowering plant in the family Arecaceae. It is a tree endemic to northeastern and southeastern Madagascar. It is threatened by habitat loss.
