= Lemurophoenix =

Scientific classification
- Kingdom: Plantae
- Clade: Embryophytes
- Clade: Tracheophytes
- Clade: Spermatophytes
- Clade: Angiosperms
- Clade: Monocots
- Clade: Commelinids
- Order: Arecales
- Family: Arecaceae
- Subtribe: Dypsidinae
- Genus: Lemurophoenix; J.Dransf.

Type species
- Lemurophoenix halleuxii J.Dransf.

Genus of palms

Lemurophoenix is a genus of palm trees in the family Arecaceae which are endemic to Madagascar.

== Taxonomy ==
The genus was first scientifically described in 1941 by British botanist John Dransfield in the journal Kew Bulletin. It is named after the native Malagasy name of the type species which translates to "red-lemur palm."

Two species are currently recognised:

- Lemurophoenix halleuxii J.Dransf
- Lemurophoenix laevis J.Dransf & Marcus
