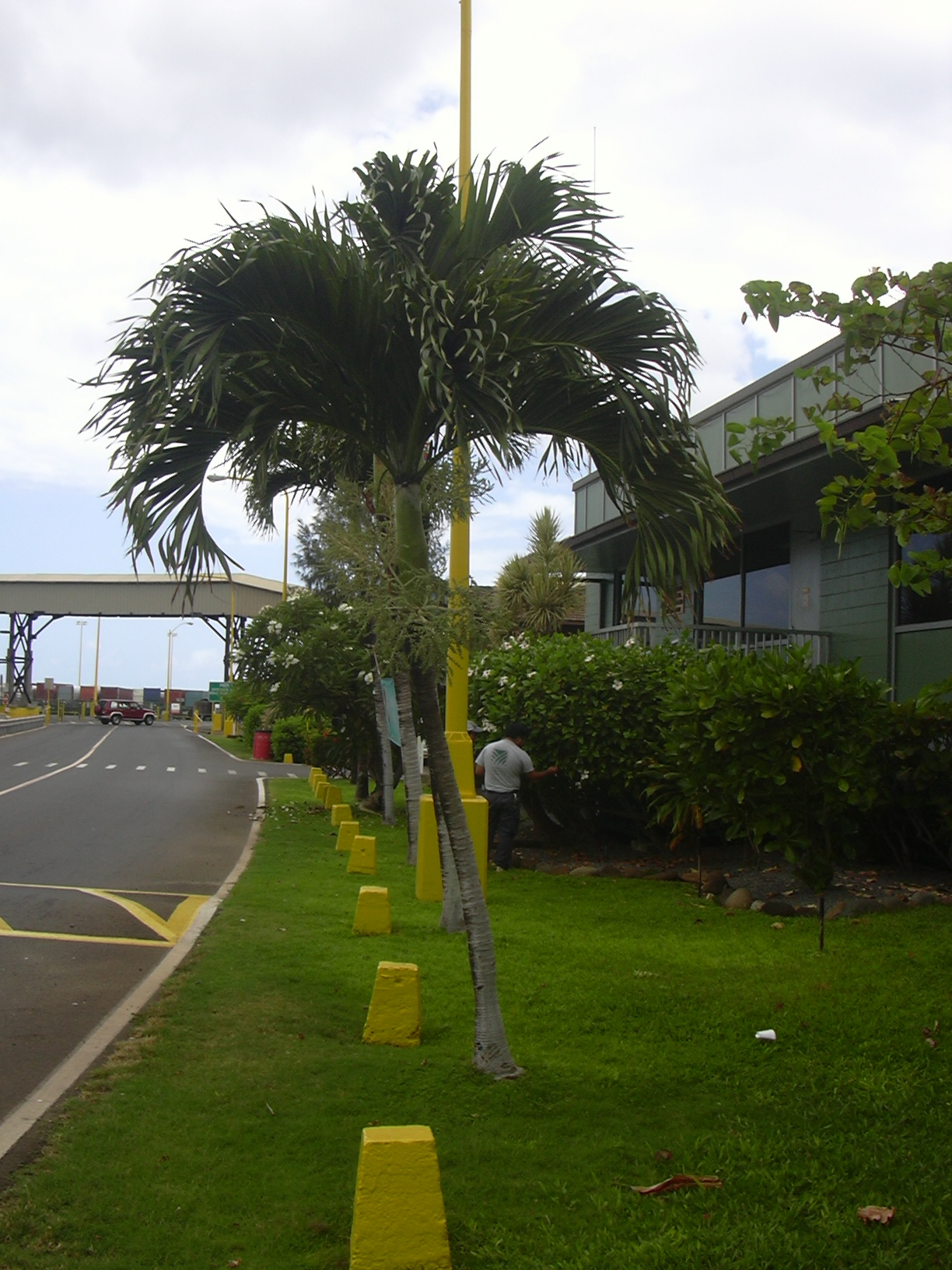
- Adonidia merrillii

Scientific classification
- Kingdom: Plantae
- Clade: Embryophytes
- Clade: Tracheophytes
- Clade: Spermatophytes
- Clade: Angiosperms
- Clade: Monocots
- Clade: Commelinids
- Order: Arecales
- Family: Arecaceae
- Subfamily: Arecoideae
- Tribe: Areceae
- Subtribe: Ptychospermatinae
- Genus: Adonidia; Becc.

Species
- Adonidia dransfieldii; Adonidia merrillii; Adonidia zibabaoa

= Adonidia =

Genus of palms

Adonidia is a genus of flowering plants in the family Arecaceae, native to the Philippines and Borneo.

== History of the genus ==
The genus was originally described in 1919. In 1957, it was transferred to the genus Veitchia. In 2008, further study returned it to its own genus. Thus, some older photos from the 1957-2008 period use Veitchia instead of Adonidia.

Another similar palm, the genus Manjekia maturbongsii was first described in 2012 as Adonidia maturbongsii, but in 2014 it was moved to its own genus, Manjekia.

== Current status ==
Before 2025 there were two recognized species. The first, and better known, is the Manila palm (Adonidia merrillii), which is native to the Philippines (Palawan and Danjugan Island) and is reportedly naturalized in the West Indies. The second is Adonidia dransfieldii, native to Sabah in Borneo and first described in 2015.

A third species, Adonidia zibabaoa was found in 2013 and identified in 2025.

Some palms sold in retail outlets as "Adonidia" are in fact Alexander palms, which are similar but even thinner.

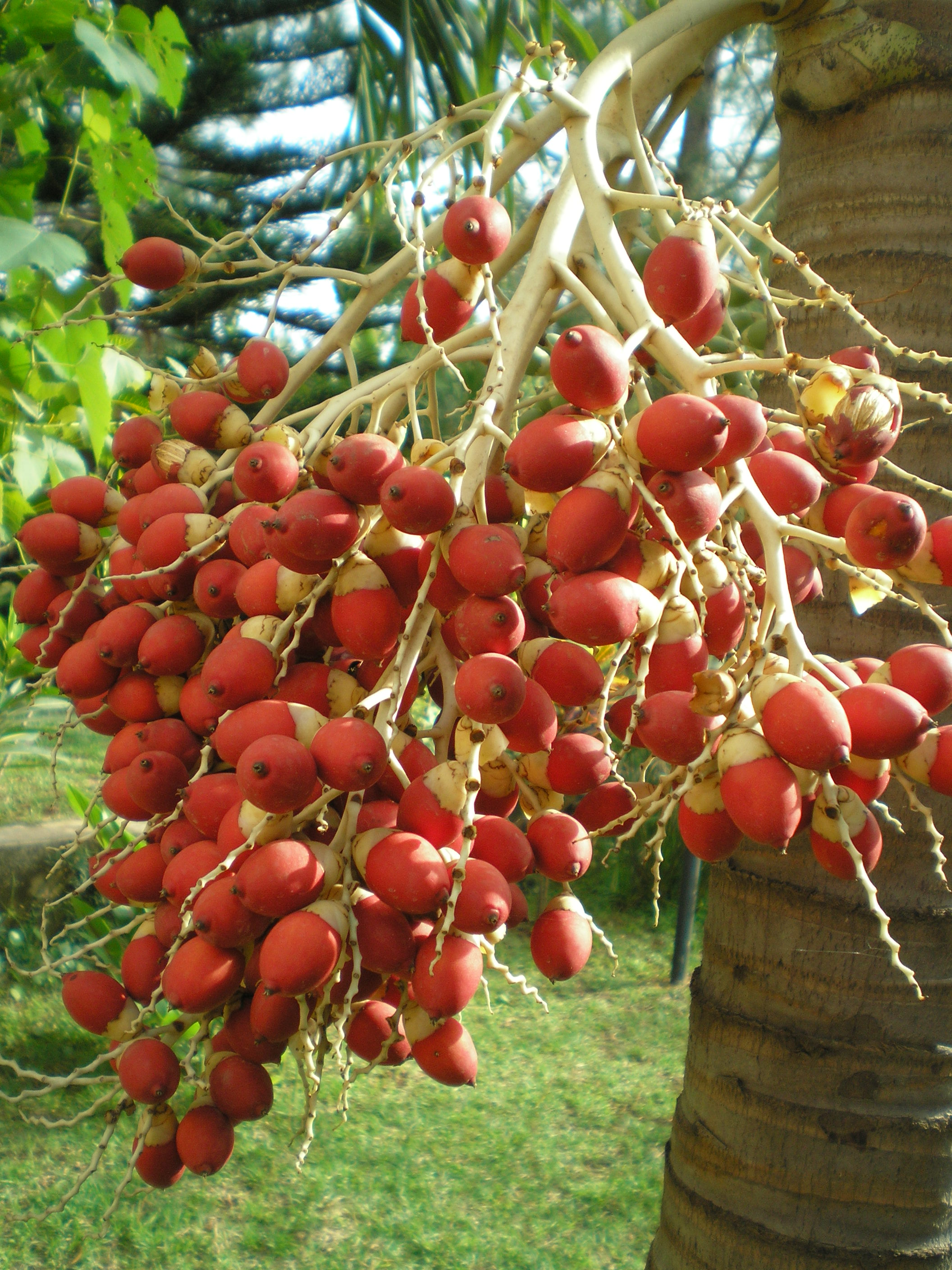
Fruits of a dwarf royal palm or Christmas palm (Adonidia merrillii) photographed in Ghana

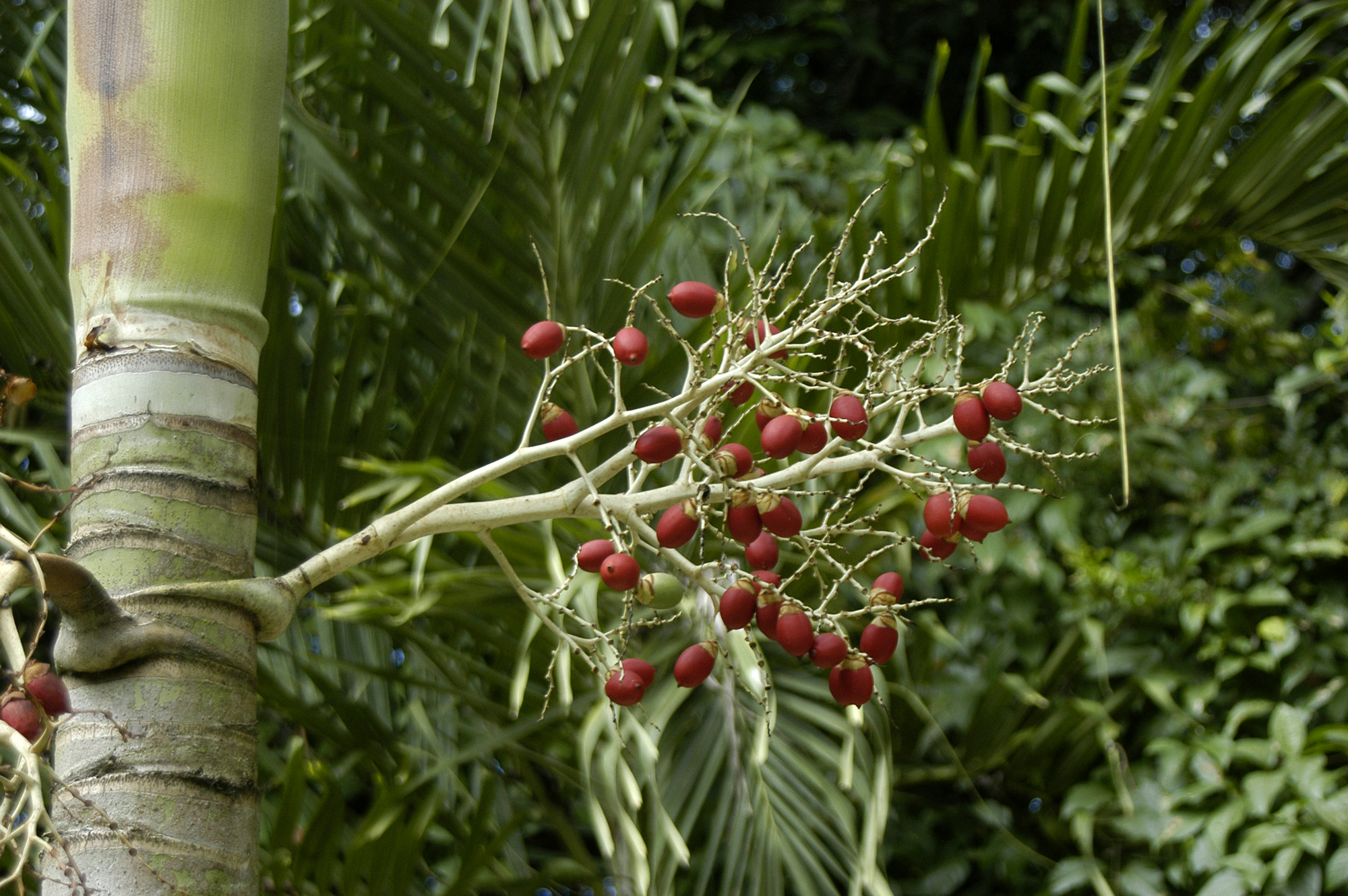
Palm and fruits. Cultivar, Bahia, Brazil
