= Zhou Huijiu =

Chinese scientist

- 周惠久
- Born: 1 March 1909; Shenyang, Fengtian Province, Qing China
- Died: 9 February 1999 (aged 89); Xi'an, Shaanxi, China
- Education: Tangshan Jiaotong University; University of Illinois; University of Michigan
- Scientific career
- Fields: Metallic materials Heat treating Mechanical properties
- Workplaces: Xi'an Jiaotong University
- Academic advisors: Harold E. Moore

Zhou Huijiu (Chinese: 周惠久; pinyin: Zhōu Huìjiǔ; 1 March 1909 – 9 February 1999) is a Chinese scientist specializing in metallic materials, heat treating and mechanical properties. He was an academician of the Chinese Academy of Sciences.

== Biography ==
Zhou was born in Shenyang, Fengtian Province, on 1 March 1909, while his ancestral home in Shaoxing, Zhejiang. He secondary studied at Shenyang No. 1 High School. In 1927, he was admitted to Tangshan Jiaotong University (now Southwest Jiaotong University), where he majored in structural engineering. After graduation in 1931, he was hired as an assistant at Northeast University. On September 18, the Mukden Incident broke out, Manchuria was annexed by the Empire of Japan. He fled to Beijing, where he served as an assistant at Tsinghua University. In 1935, he pursued advanced studies in the United States on government scholarships, earning his master's degree in mechanics from the University of Illinois under the supervision of Harold E. Moore in 1936 and master's degree in metallurgical engineering from the University of Michigan in 1938.

He returned to China in September 1938 and that same year became professor at the Department of Machinery and Aviation, National Southwestern Associated University. In 1941, he moved to the War Vehicle Mechanical Engineering Research Institute of Army Mechanization School, becoming its director in 1942. He joined the faculty of Chongqing University and National Central University in 1945. He was transferred to Chiao Tung University (1921) in 1947. In 1948, he co-founded the Wuxi Kaiyuan Machine Factory (无锡开源机器厂) of which he himself served as chief engineer and factory manager.

After the factory became a joint state-privately enterprise in 1952, he was recalled to the Department of Mechanical Manufacturing, Jiaotong University as a professor and director of metal laboratory. He joined the Jiusan Society in 1953 and the Communist Party in 1958, respectively. In 1958, in response to the call of the Communist government to support the construction of the Northwest China, his family moved to Xi'an and taught at Xi'an Jiaotong University, where he successively served as director of the Department of Mechanical Engineering, director of the Institute of Metal Materials and Strength, and vice president (1980–1984). During the Cultural Revolution in 1971, he forced to work at Baoji Petroleum Machinery Factory (宝鸡石油机械厂).

On 9 February 1999, he died in Xi'an, Shaanxi, aged 89.

== Publications ==
- Zhou Huijiu, ed. (1982). 工具制造计算方法 [Tool Manufacturing Calculation Method] (in Chinese). Beijing: Machinery Industry Publishing House. ISBN 9787092390677.
- Zhou Huijiu, ed. (2000). 新材料辞典 [Dictionary of New Materials] (in Chinese). Shanghai: Shanghai Science and Technology Literature Publishing House. ISBN 9787068248896.
- Zhou Huijiu; Huang Mingzhi, eds. (2010). 金属材料强度学 [Strength of Metallic Materials] (in Chinese). Beijing: Science Press. ISBN 9787030007049.

== Honours and awards ==
- 1980 Member of the Chinese Academy of Sciences (CAS)
