= Adonidia zibabaoa =

Scientific classification
- Kingdom: Plantae
- Clade: Tracheophytes
- Clade: Angiosperms
- Clade: Monocots
- Clade: Commelinids
- Order: Arecales
- Family: Arecaceae
- Genus: Adonidia
- Species: A. zibabaoa

Binomial name
- Adonidia zibabaoa Adorador & Fernando

Palm species

Adonidia zibabaoa is a palm in the genus Adonidia. It was found in 2013, described in 2017, and formally identified in 2025.

It was found growing on karst limestone on Samar island in the Philippines, at an altitude of about 380 m (1,250 ft). The name zibabaoa derives from an old name for the island.

Royal Botanic Gardens, Kew listed it as one of its "top 10 plants and fungi named new to science in 2025". As of 8 January 2026 World Flora Online stated that in its December 2025 update "this species name was unplaced by WFO (a taxonomist hasn't yet placed the name in the taxonomy)".
