= Gesneriad Society =

International horticultural society

- Formation: 1951
- Founder: Elvin McDonald
- Founded at: Missouri, United States

The Gesneriad Society, Inc., is an international horticultural society devoted to the promotion, cultivation, and study of gesneriads (plant family Gesneriaceae). The organization was founded in 1951 as the American Gloxinia Society by Elvin McDonald and incorporated in the state of Missouri in 1954. In 1978 it became the American Gloxinia and Gesneriad Society, and in 2005 simply The Gesneriad Society. It now has a worldwide membership with chapters in the United States, Canada, and Sweden. It is the International Cultivar Registration Authority for gesneriads.

== Publications ==
The organization publishes a quarterly magazine, Gesneriads (formerly The Gloxinian).

== Honorary members ==
Harold E. Moore as made an Honorary Life Member of the American Gloxinia and Gesneriad Society in 1958.
