= Genera Palmarum =

2008 book

- Language: English
- Subject: Botany
- Publisher: Royal Botanic Gardens, Kew
- Publication date: 2008
- ISBN: 978-1-84246-182-2
- OCLC: 890586925

Genera Palmarum is a botany reference book that gives a detailed overview of the systematic biology of the palm family (Arecaceae). The first edition of Genera Palmarum was published in 1987. The second edition was published in 2008, with a reprint published in 2014. Genera Palmarum is currently the most detailed monograph on palm taxonomy and systematics.

== History ==
=== Beginnings ===
When Liberty Hyde Bailey, an American horticulturist and botanist who founded the L. H. Bailey Hortorium at Cornell University, began studying palms in the early 1900s, about 700 species had been identified. The number reached 1,000 by 1946, the rise due in large part to his intensive study of the family. Ill health finally forced Bailey to discontinue collecting abroad in 1949, at the age of 91. He continued to study, compare, and write about his palm specimens. His ultimate goal was to produce an authoritative guide to all palms, titled Genera Palmarum.

Harold E. Moore, Jr. (1917–1980), a botanist at the L. H. Bailey Hortorium at Cornell University, began his work on palms in 1948 with the encouragement of Bailey himself, who was then 90 years old. Bailey had wanted to create a "Genera Palmarum", a proper delineation of the palm family and all the genera within it. When Bailey died in 1954, he left behind a manuscript of the first page of the introduction, and the job was left to Moore. Moore visited the major historic collections of palms in United States and Europe and learned that existing collections often lacked the features that were needed to understand the evolutionary relationships among the genera. This led to a worldwide effort on his part to see and collect as many palm genera as he could. By the time of his death in 1980 he had traveled to many remote locations and had collected all but 18 of the approximately 200 genera of palms. These exploits earned him membership in The Explorers Club.

In 1973 Moore wrote a paper, The Major Groups of Palms and Their Distribution, which presented the outline of his classification of the family. He continued to build on this, and in 1980 was finally ready to devote three years to the production of Genera Palmarum. He died the same year, leaving the work of completing the work to Natalie Uhl and John Dransfield.

=== First edition ===
During the 1970s, Harold E. Moore began working on what was to become the first edition of Genera Palmarum. After Moore's death, Natalie Uhl and John Dransfield followed up on Moore's unfinished work of attempting a comprehensive taxonomy of the palm family. Uhl and Dransfield continued working on Moore's taxonomy of the palm family, eventually arriving at a classification consisting of 6 subfamilies, 14 tribes, and 36 subtribes. The first edition of Genera Palmarum was published in 1987.

=== Second edition ===
With the advent of molecular phylogenetics, the classification of the palm family continually underwent heavy revision following the 1987 publication of Genera Palmarum. In the early 2000s, work began on the second edition of Genera Palmarum, culminating in its final publication in 2008.

== Subsequent taxonomic revisions ==
Genera Palmarum (2008) lists 183 genera in the palm family, Arecaceae. Lanonia, Saribus, and the monotypic genera Jailoloa, Wallaceodoxa, Manjekia, and Sabinaria, which were described after 2008, are not included in Genera Palmarum (2008). Ceratolobus, Daemonorops, Pogonotium, Wallichia, Lytocaryum, and the monotypic genera Retispatha, Pritchardiopsis, and Solfia have since been removed from Genera Palmarum (2008) as obsolete genera. This brings the total number of Arecaceae genera to 181 as of 2016.

== See also ==
- List of Arecaceae genera
- Historia naturalis palmarum, the most detailed book covering the palm family prior to the publication of Genera Palmarum

== Bibliography ==
- Uhl, Natalie W.; Dransfield, John (1987). Genera Palmarum: a classification of palms based on the work of Harold E. Moore, Jr. Lawrence, Kan.: L.H. Bailey Hortorium. ISBN 0935868305. OCLC 15641317.
- Dransfield, John; Uhl, Natalie W.; Asmussen, Conny B.; Baker, William J.; Harley, Madeline; Lewis, Carl (2008). Genera Palmarum: the evolution and classification of palms. Richmond, Surrey, UK: Kew Pub. ISBN 9781842461822. OCLC 265983827.
