= Lemurophoenix laevis =

Scientific classification
- Kingdom: Plantae
- Clade: Embryophytes
- Clade: Tracheophytes
- Clade: Spermatophytes
- Clade: Angiosperms
- Clade: Monocots
- Clade: Commelinids
- Order: Arecales
- Family: Arecaceae
- Genus: Lemurophoenix
- Species: L. laevis

Binomial name
- Lemurophoenix laevis J.Dransf. & Marcus.

Species of palms

Lemurophoenix laevis is a species of palm tree which is endemic to Madagascar.
