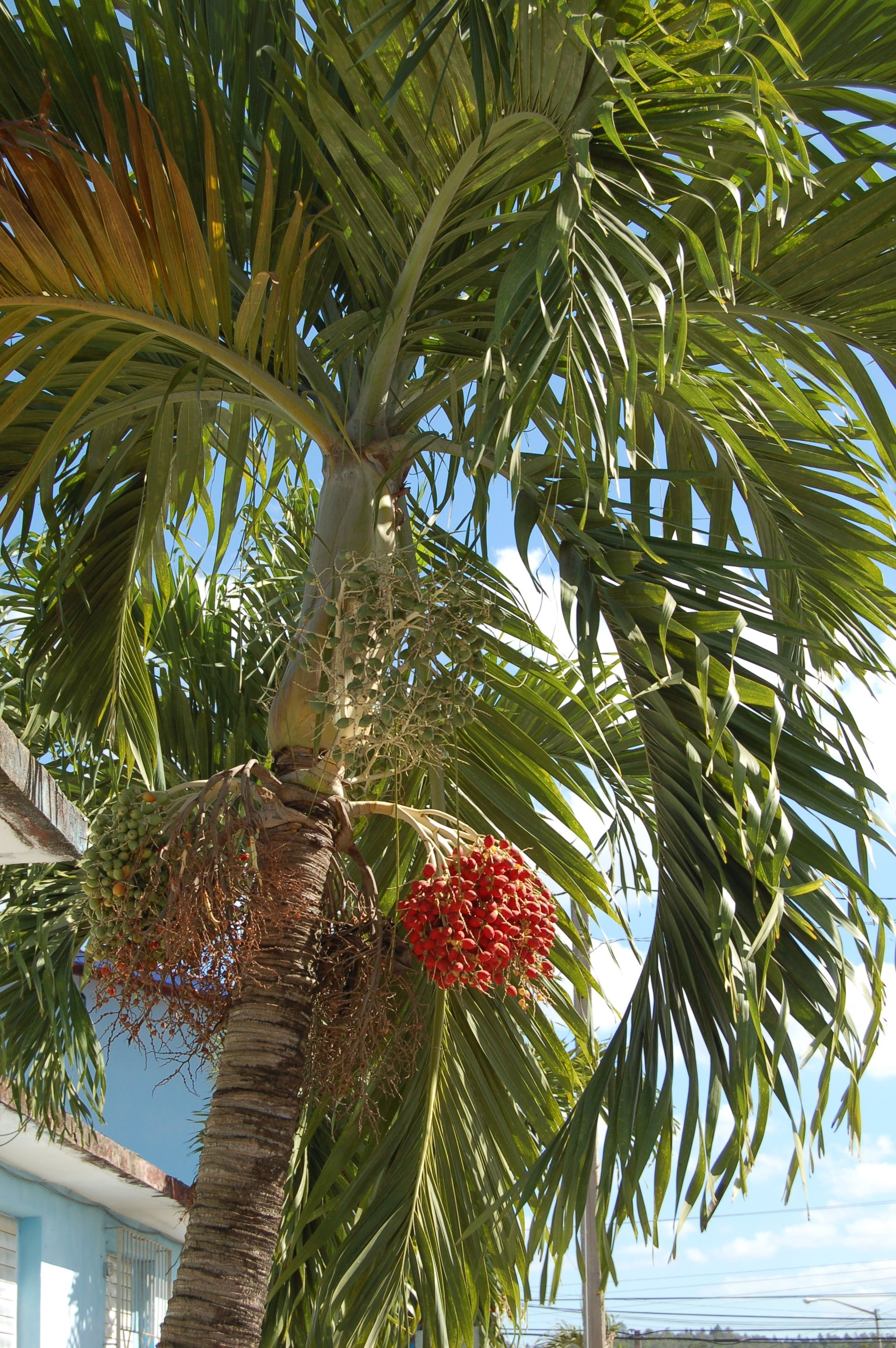

Conservation status
- Vulnerable (IUCN 3.1)

Scientific classification
- Kingdom: Plantae
- Clade: Embryophytes
- Clade: Tracheophytes
- Clade: Spermatophytes
- Clade: Angiosperms
- Clade: Monocots
- Clade: Commelinids
- Order: Arecales
- Family: Arecaceae
- Genus: Adonidia
- Species: A. merrillii

Binomial name
- Adonidia merrillii Becc.

Synonyms
- Normanbya merrillii Becc; Veitchia merrillii (Becc.) H.E.Moore

= Adonidia merrillii =

Species of palm native to the Philippines

Adonidia merrillii, the Manila palm, is a palm tree species endemic to the Philippines (Palawan and Danjugan Island). This palm was cultivated for centuries in the Philippines before becoming a staple in the West. It is reportedly naturalized in the West Indies and Florida. It is commonly known as the "Christmas palm" because its fruits become bright scarlet and tend to be that color in winter. This palm is typically fairly small and slender, normally attaining 25 feet or 8 meters in height but has attained over 40 feet in some instances. Most plants maintain 5-7 fronds when young, gradually building up the crown as the palm ages, and sometimes reaches 10-12 fronds when mature.

== Uses, cultivation, and care ==
The Adonidia palm, sometimes described as the "mini-royal-palm", adapts well to landscaping and cultivation, as well as growing in pots. It is able to withstand large amounts of rainfall and can tolerate short droughts, though it does not like sea salt. Adonidias prefer full sun but can withstand partial shade. They are not tolerant of the cold, making their perennial outdoor usage limited to frost-free zones. One of the most common landscape palms in Southern Florida (used at such places as the Miami Open tennis tournament), it is often clustered together in groups of 2-3, sometimes four. Because, in its natural state, it grows as a solitary palm, this batching together of several heads runs the risk of the head competing against themselves. In order to minimize the risk, nurseries train these palms when young to arch outward, instead of growing straight up.

Adonidia merrillii is widely planted in cultivation and grows well in tropical locations such as Hawaii and the southern half of the Florida peninsula. It is also one of the most commonly planted ornamental palms in the world, often planted in non-tropical locations such as shopping malls. It is sometimes used as an annual in places that see a freeze in the winter (for example, Times Square, New York City plants these for summer).

The Adonidia is also commonly placed indoors in hotels, casinos, and other higher-end establishments due to its ability to adjust to lower light conditions. They are self-pruning palms and require little to no maintenance. Its fruits are sometimes said to be used as a substitute for the betel nut, in preparing buyo (fruit of Areca catechu, leaves of Piper betle, and lime) for chewing.

== Gallery ==
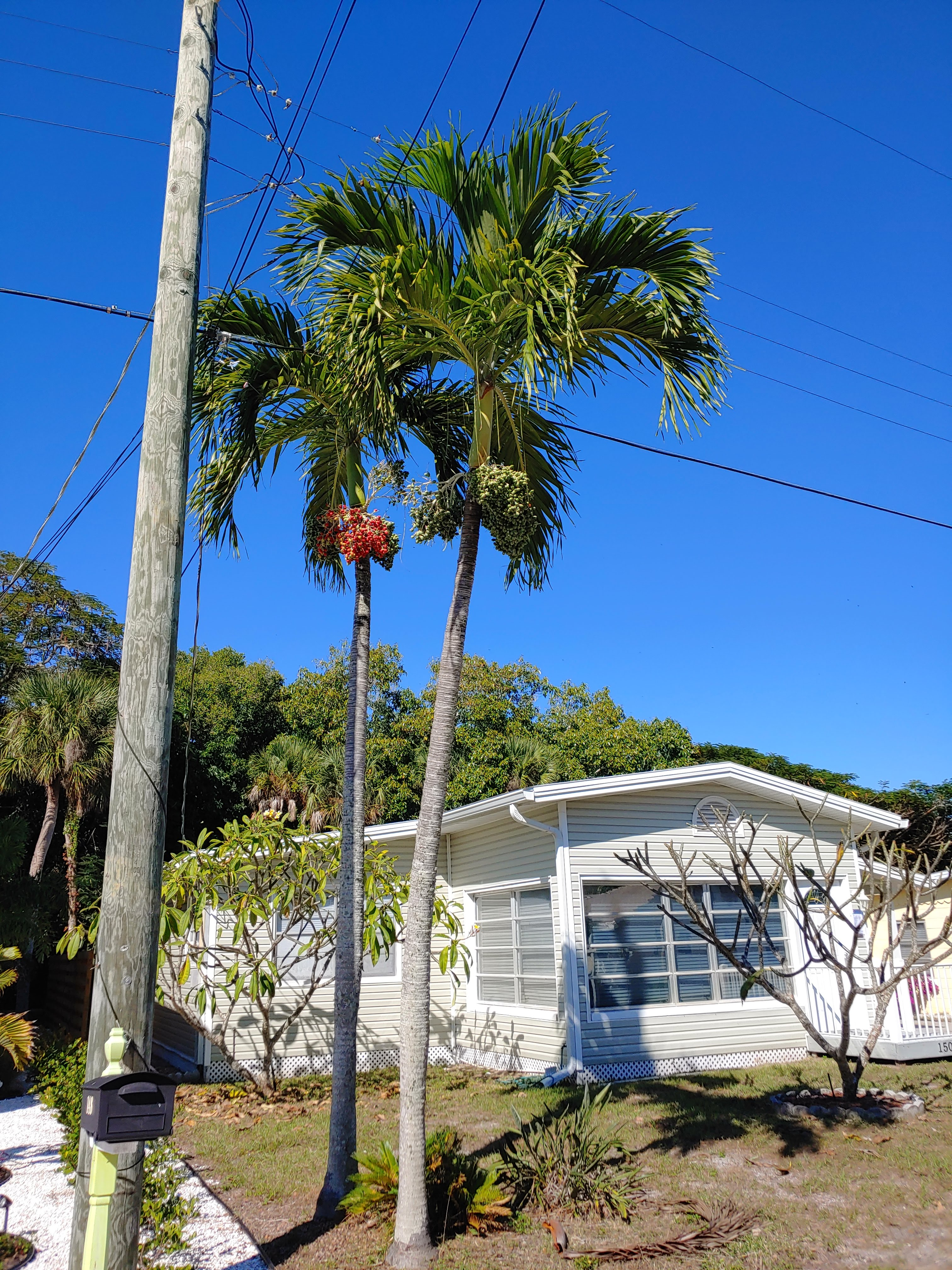
Mature Adonidia merrillii with seeds, Englewood Fl.

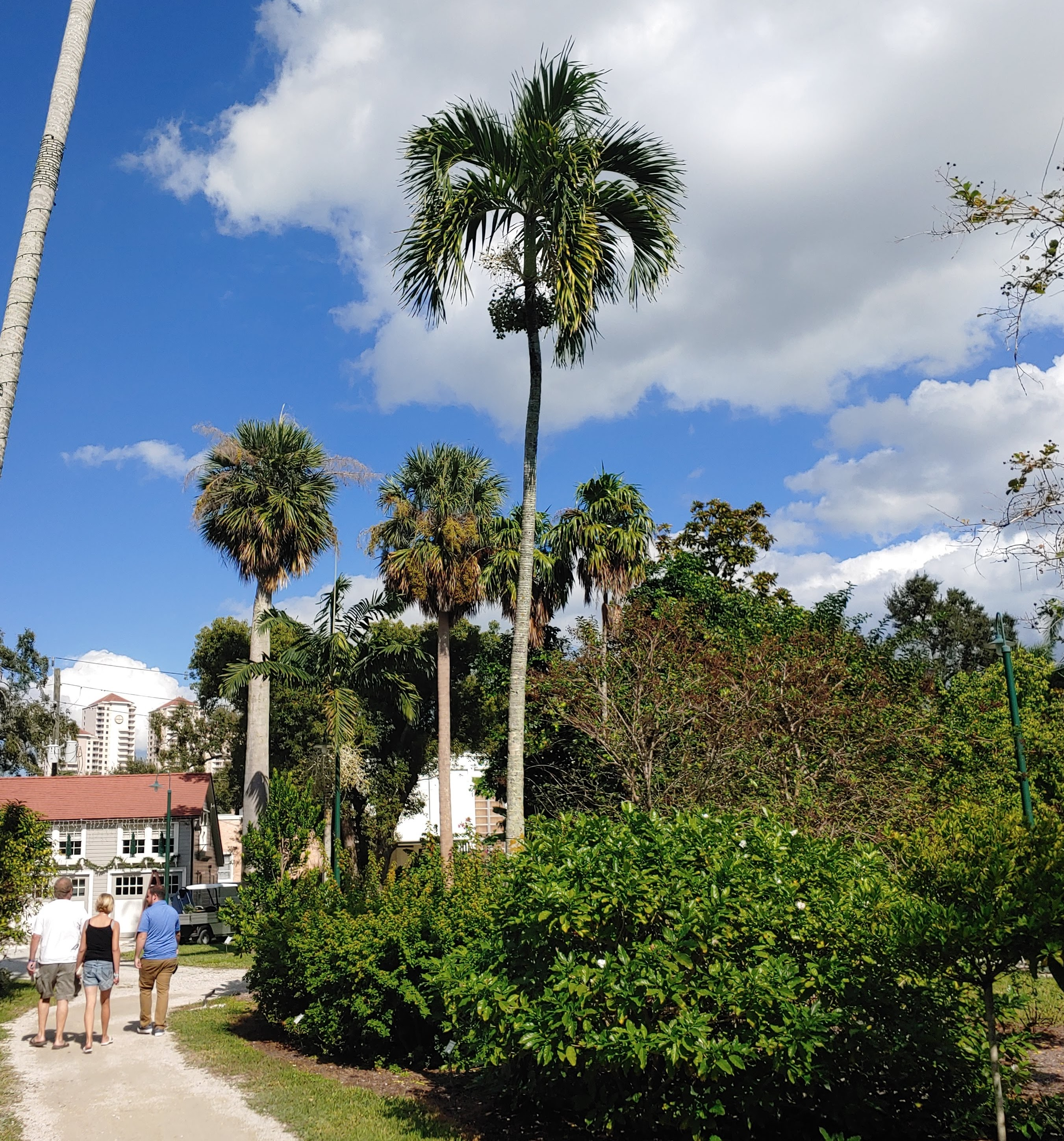
Old Adonidia merrellii in Fort Myers Fl.

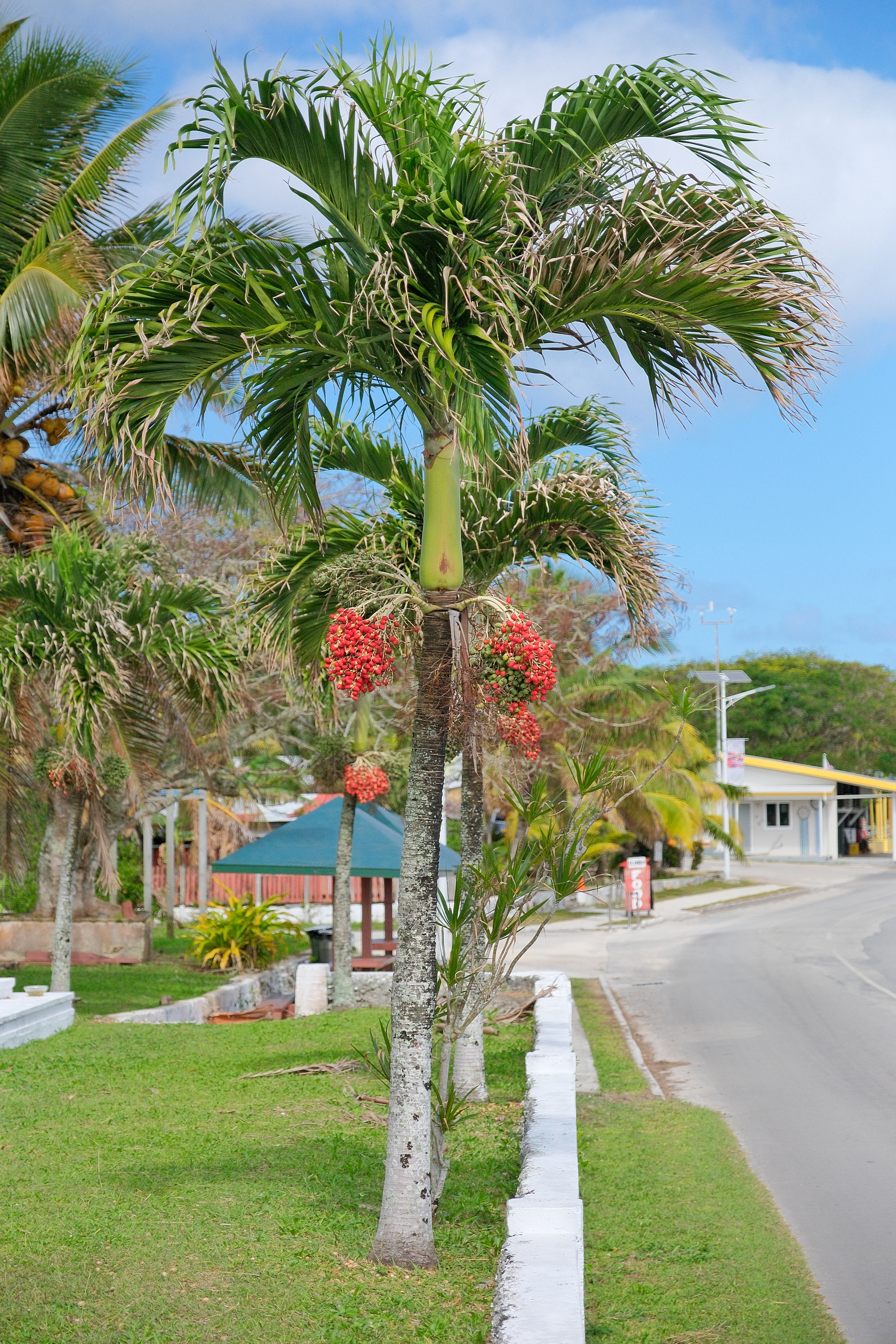
Adonidia merrillii with seeds, Niue.

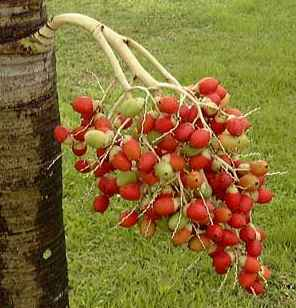
Ripe Fruit.

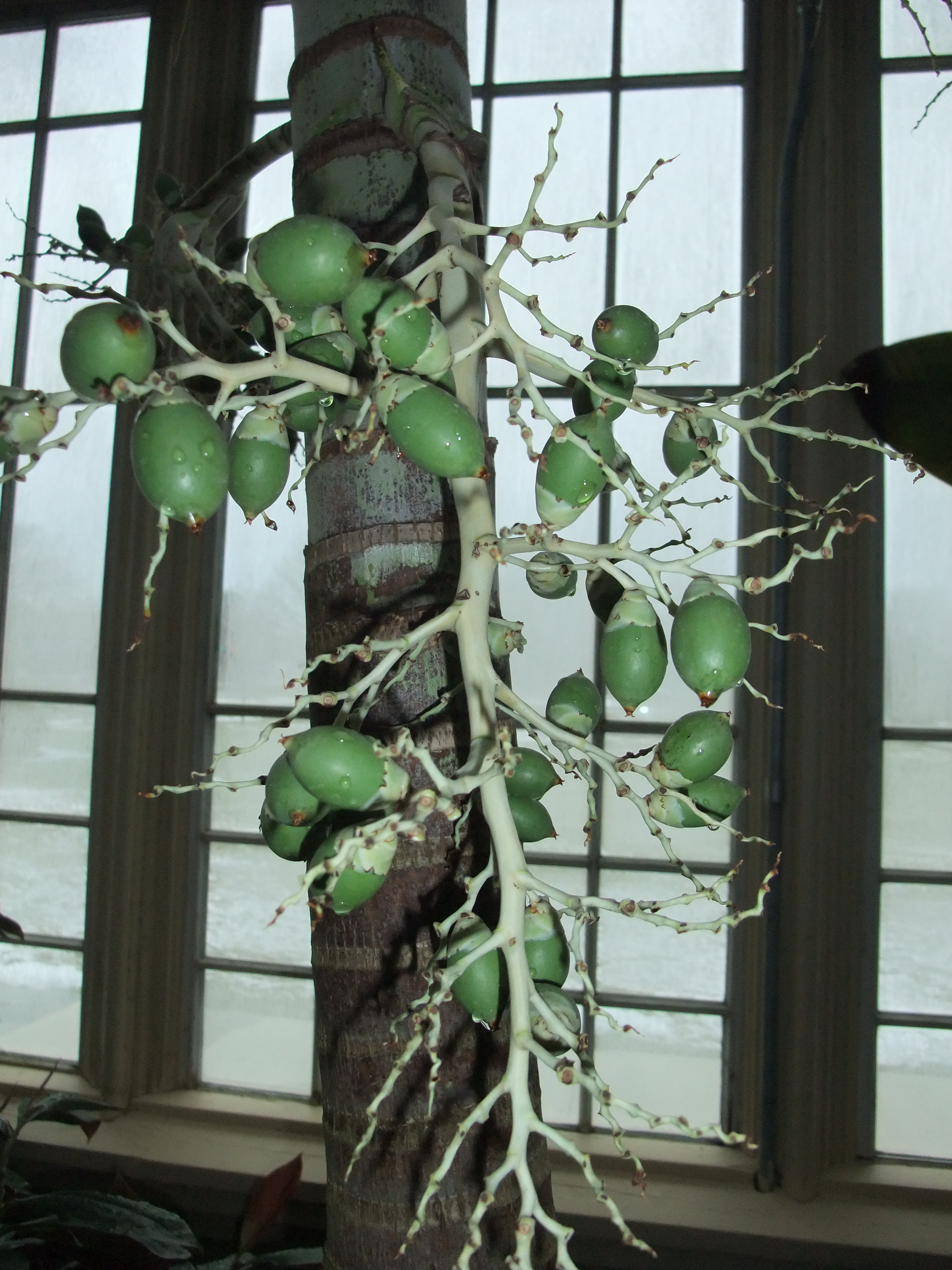
Immature Fruit.

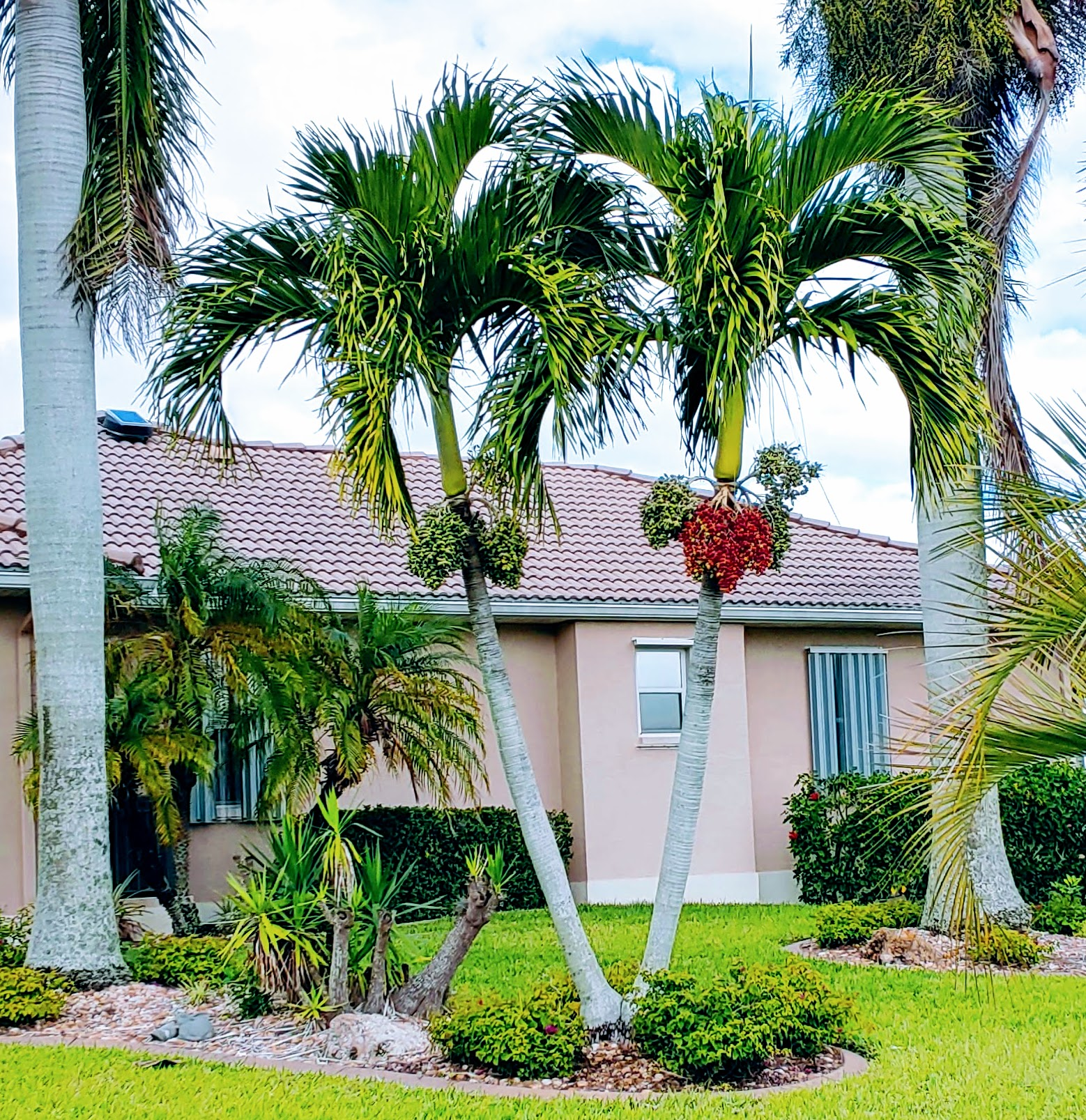
Double planting of Adonidia merrillii with ripe seeds.

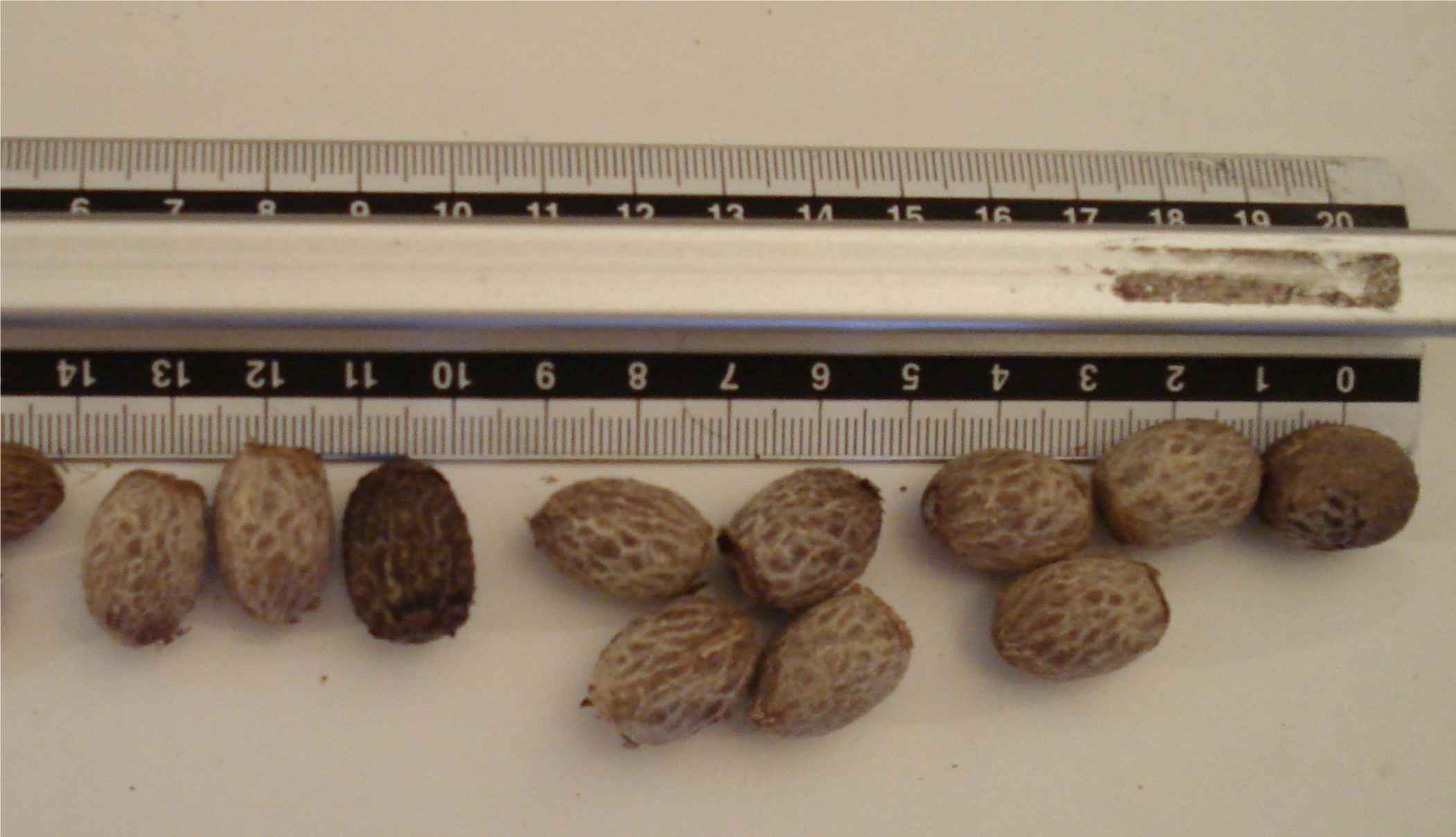
Ripe seeds

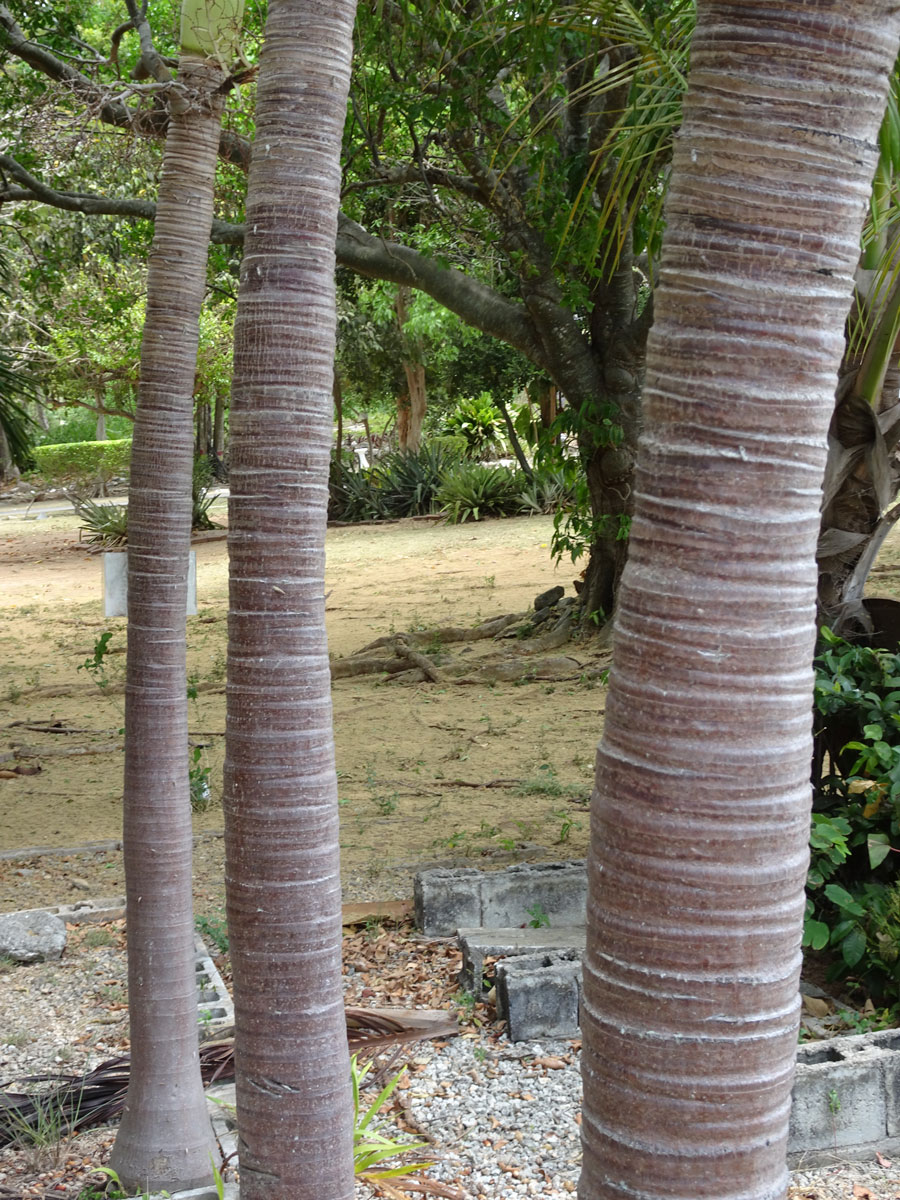
trunk
