= Adonidia dransfieldii =

Conservation status
- Critically Endangered (IUCN 3.1)

Scientific classification
- Kingdom: Plantae
- Clade: Tracheophytes
- Clade: Angiosperms
- Clade: Monocots
- Clade: Commelinids
- Order: Arecales
- Family: Arecaceae
- Genus: Adonidia
- Species: A. dransfieldii

Binomial name
- Adonidia dransfieldii K.M.Wong, Sugau & Y.W.Low

Species of palm

Adonidia dransfieldii is a species of Adonidia palm native to Sabah, Borneo, Malaysia. It grows up to 7 metres (23 ft) in height.

It is very similar in appearance to the much more common Adonidia merrillii with the chief visual differences being a slightly more golden coloration, more slender trunk, more upright inflorescence, thinner leaves, and less clefted trunks. However, the basic overall appearance is quite similar and, given the relatively short biological distance between Sabah and Palawan, suggests a recent speciation in the past few million years or less.

Notably, this species, though critically endangered, may be the older of the two.

First discovered in 1998 from a mere 14 individuals in the wild, it took some time to ascertain the scientific aspect of this species. This was in part due to the process of allowing the collected seeds to grow and mature at Sabah's Forest Research Centre. Over time, differences between this species and Adonidia merrillii became evident.

It was finally described scientifically in 2015.
