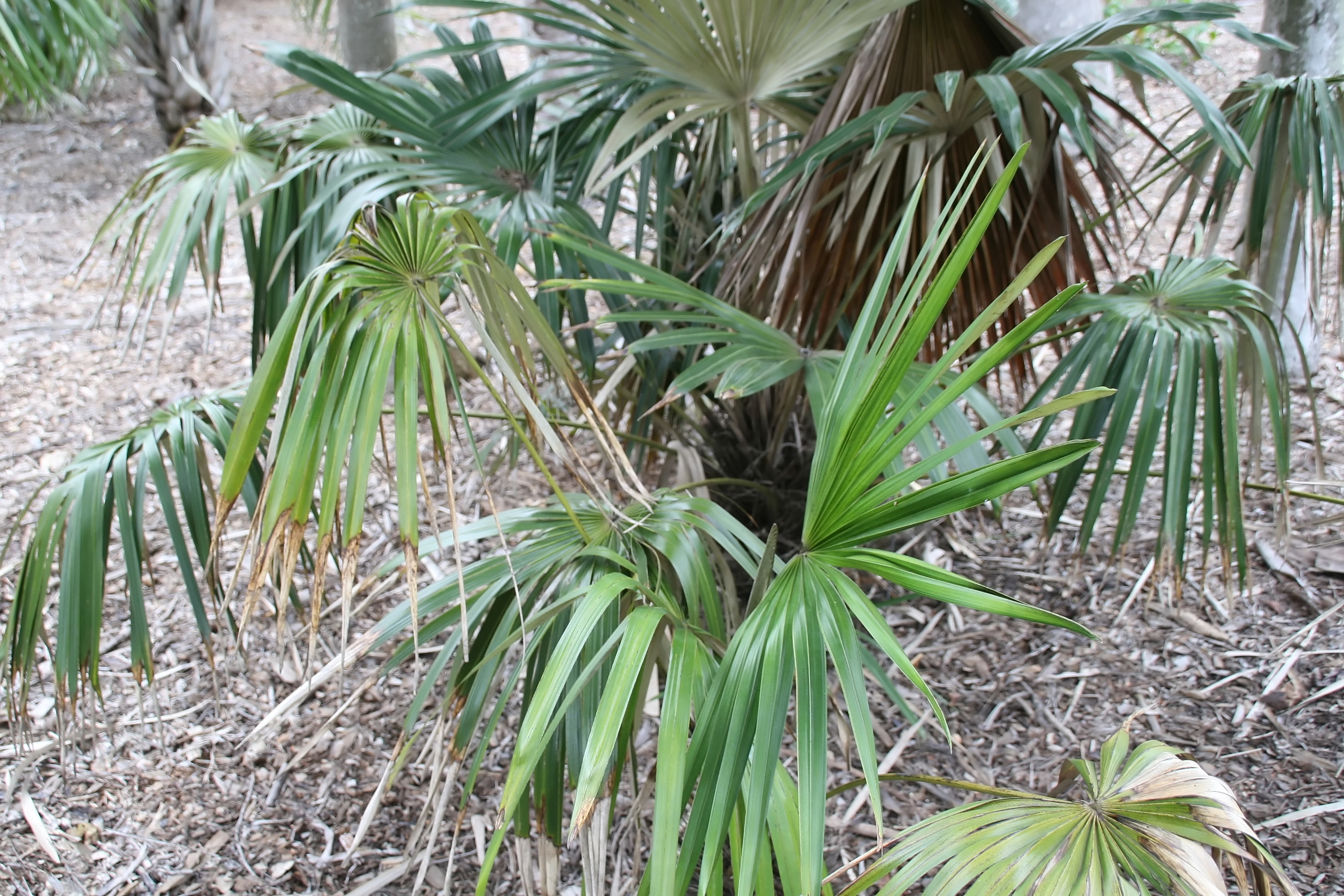

Scientific classification
- Kingdom: Plantae
- Clade: Embryophytes
- Clade: Tracheophytes
- Clade: Angiosperms
- Clade: Monocots
- Clade: Commelinids
- Order: Arecales
- Family: Arecaceae
- Tribe: Trachycarpeae
- Genus: Guihaia
- Species: G. argyrata

Binomial name
- Guihaia argyrata (S.K.Lee & F.N.Wei) S.K.Lee, F.N.Wei & J.Dransf

Synonyms
- Trachycarpus argyratus S.K.Lee & F.N.Wei

= Guihaia argyrata =

Species of flowering plant

Guihaia argyrata is a species of palm native to China and Vietnam.
