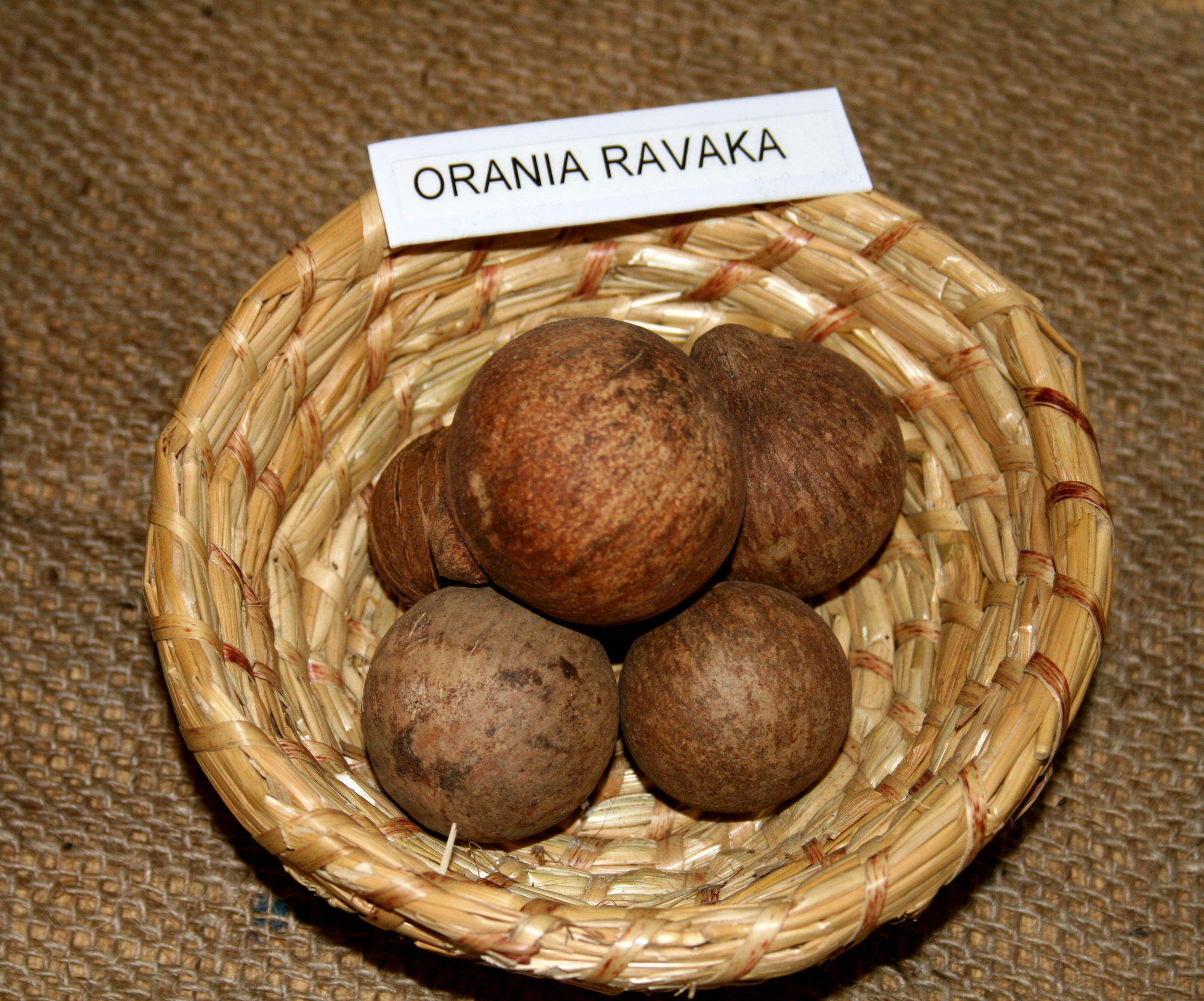
- Seeds

Conservation status
- Vulnerable (IUCN 3.1)

Scientific classification
- Kingdom: Plantae
- Clade: Embryophytes
- Clade: Tracheophytes
- Clade: Angiosperms
- Clade: Monocots
- Clade: Commelinids
- Order: Arecales
- Family: Arecaceae
- Genus: Orania
- Species: O. ravaka

Binomial name
- Orania ravaka Beentje

= Orania ravaka =

Species of flowering plant

Orania ravaka is a species of flowering plant in the family Arecaceae.

== Range and habitat ==
Orania ravaka is found only in northeastern Madagascar, around Antongil Bay, including the western Masoala Peninsula and the lowlands to the west and north. It is known from six locations. Its habitat is lowland rainforest, including ridge tops and valley bottoms, between 100 and 900 meters (330 and 2,950 ft) of elevation.

The species is threatened by habitat loss from shifting cultivation and logging.
