= Orania decipiens =

Conservation status
- Least Concern (IUCN 3.1)

Scientific classification
- Kingdom: Plantae
- Clade: Tracheophytes
- Clade: Angiosperms
- Clade: Monocots
- Clade: Commelinids
- Order: Arecales
- Family: Arecaceae
- Genus: Orania
- Species: O. decipiens

Binomial name
- Orania decipiens Becc.

Species of palm

Orania decipiens is a species of flowering plant in the family Arecaceae. It is found only in the Philippines.
