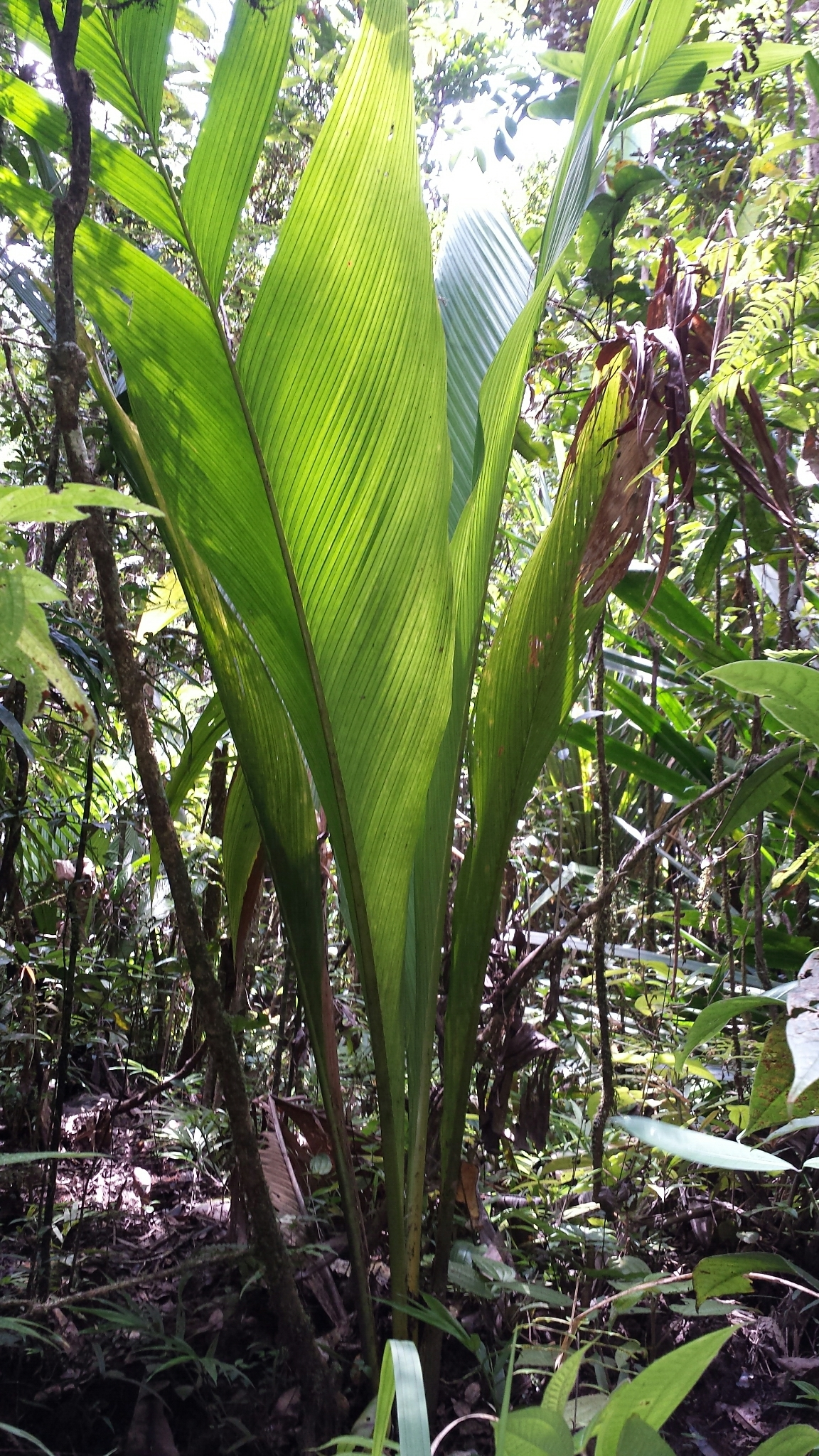
- Marojejya darianii

Scientific classification
- Kingdom: Plantae
- Clade: Tracheophytes
- Clade: Angiosperms
- Clade: Monocots
- Clade: Commelinids
- Order: Arecales
- Family: Arecaceae
- Subfamily: Arecoideae
- Tribe: Areceae
- Subtribe: Dypsidinae
- Genus: Marojejya; Humbert

= Marojejya =

Genus of palms

Marojejya is a genus of flowering plant in the family Arecaceae. It contains the following two species, both endemic to Madagascar:

- Marojejya darianii J.Dransf. & N.W.Uhl
- Marojejya insignis Humbert
