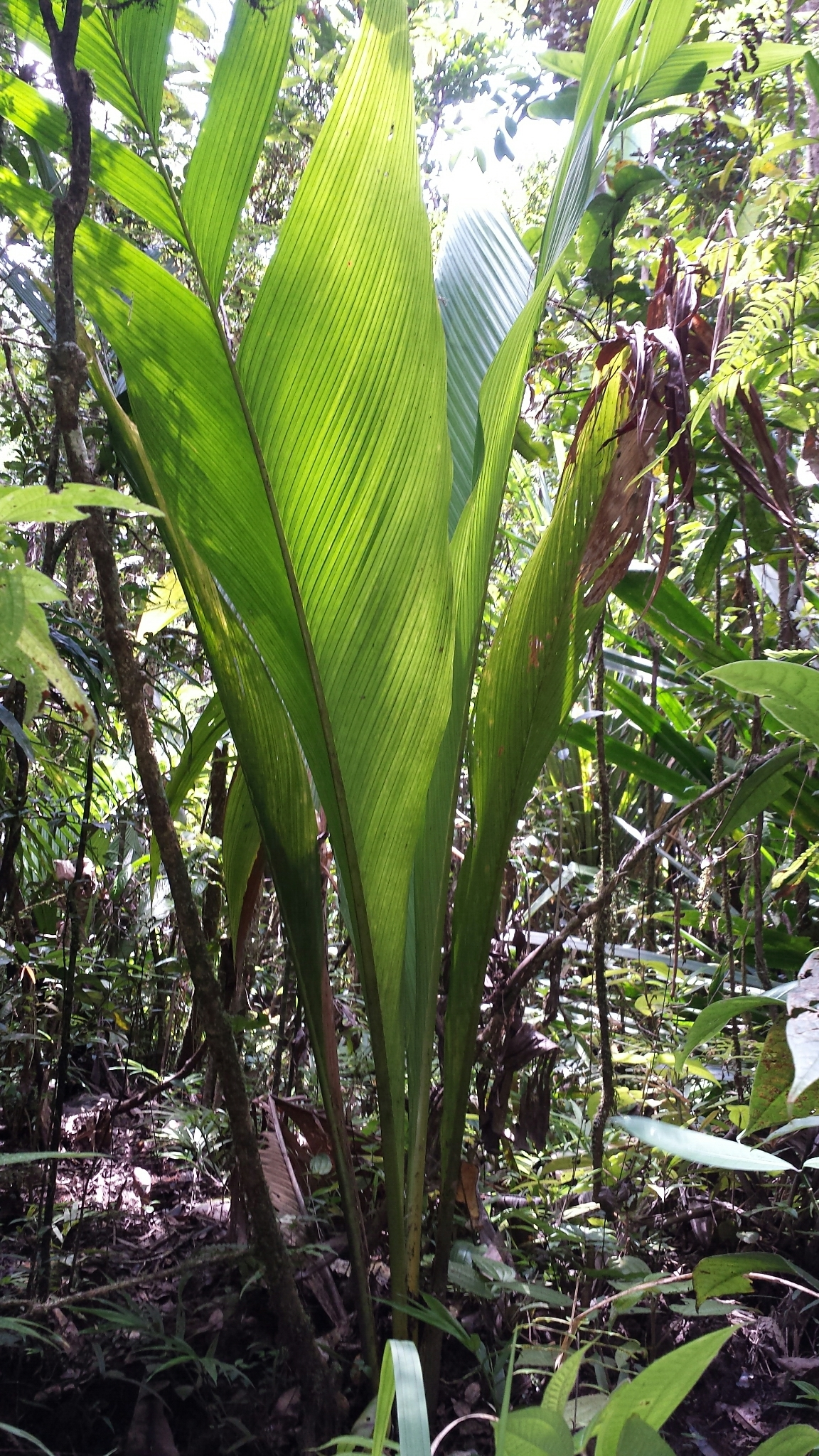

Conservation status
- Endangered (IUCN 3.1)
- CITES Appendix II

Scientific classification
- Kingdom: Plantae
- Clade: Tracheophytes
- Clade: Angiosperms
- Clade: Monocots
- Clade: Commelinids
- Order: Arecales
- Family: Arecaceae
- Genus: Marojejya
- Species: M. darianii

Binomial name
- Marojejya darianii J.Dransf. & N.W.Uhl

= Marojejya darianii =

Species of palm

Marojejya darianii, the big-leaf palm or Ravimbe Palm, is a species of flowering palm tree in the Palm Family (Arecaceae or Palmae). It is found only in the rainforests of northeastern Madagascar and was completely unknown to the larger world until 1984 when it was discovered by Dr. Mardy Darian. It is critically endangered, and threatened with extinction due to habitat loss. It is important because it bears the largest simple leaves (undivided, unlobed) of any known tree; up to thirty feet (9.1 meters) long by up to four feet (1.2 meters) wide.
