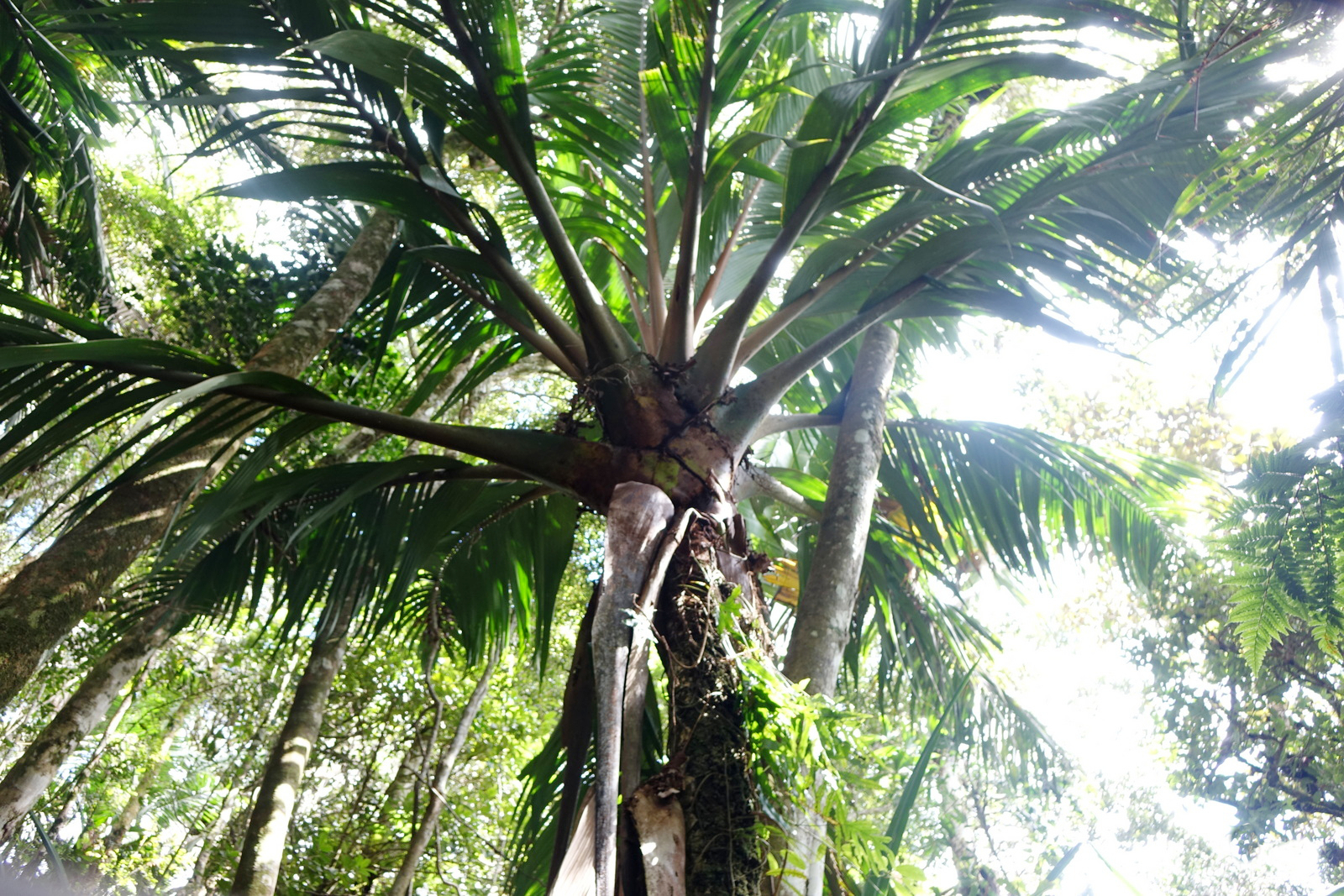

Conservation status
- Least Concern (IUCN 3.1)

Scientific classification
- Kingdom: Plantae
- Clade: Tracheophytes
- Clade: Angiosperms
- Clade: Monocots
- Clade: Commelinids
- Order: Arecales
- Family: Arecaceae
- Genus: Marojejya
- Species: M. insignis

Binomial name
- Marojejya insignis Humbert

= Marojejya insignis =

Species of palm

Marojejya insignis is a species of flowering plant in the palm family Arecaceae. It is found only in Madagascar. It is threatened by habitat loss. It is most noteworthy for unusual leaves in which a proximal (inner) portion is entire, while the distal (outer) portion is divided into leaflets. It was described by Humbert in 1955.
