= Harold E. Moore =

American botanist (1917–1980)

- Born: July 7, 1917; Massachusetts
- Died: October 17, 1980 (aged 63); Ithaca, New York
- Citizenship: United States
- Education: Massachusetts State College; Harvard University
- Scientific career
- Workplaces: L. H. Bailey Hortorium, Cornell University
- Author abbrev. (botany): H.E.Moore

Harold Emery Moore, Jr. (July 7, 1917 – October 17, 1980) was an American botanist especially known for his work on the systematics of the palm family. He served as Director of the L. H. Bailey Hortorium at Cornell University, and was appointed Liberty Hyde Bailey Professor of Botany in 1978. He was an important contributor to Hortus Third and was editor of Principes (now Palms), the journal of the International Palm Society. He also edited Gentes Herbarum and provided the foundation for the first edition of Genera Palmarum, a seminal work on palm taxonomy which was later completed by Natalie Uhl and John Dransfield.

== Early life and education ==
Moore was born in Massachusetts in 1917. He received his B.S. from Massachusetts State College in 1939. He then moved to Harvard University where he obtained his M.S. in 1940 and Ph.D. in 1942. After graduating, he served in the United States Army from 1942 to 1946.

== Career ==
In 1947, he joined the staff of the Gray Herbarium at Harvard. In 1948 he moved to the L. H. Bailey Hortorium at Cornell as an Assistant Professor of Botany. He was appointed Associate Professor in 1951 and full Professor in 1960. Between 1960 and 1969 he served as director of the herbarium, and was elected Bailey Professor of Botany in 1978. Although best known for his work on palms, Moore also made notable contributions to the study of the Gesneriaceae, the Geraniaceae, the Amaryllidaceae, the Cucurbitaceae and the Commelinaceae.

Moore began his work on palms in 1948 with the encouragement of Bailey himself, who was then 90 years old. Bailey had wanted to create a Genera Palmarum, a proper delineation of the palm family and all the genera within it. When Bailey died in 1954, the job was left to Moore. Moore visited the major historic collections of palms in United States and Europe and learned that existing collections often lacked the features that were needed to understand the evolutionary relationships among the genera. This led to a worldwide effort on his part to see and collect as many palm genera as he could. By the time of his death in 1980 he had traveled to many remote locations and had collected all but 18 of the approximately 200 genera of palms. These exploits earned him membership in The Explorers Club.

In 1973 Moore wrote a paper, The Major Groups of Palms and Their Distribution, which presented the outline of his classification of the family. He continued to build on this, and in 1980 was finally ready to devote three years to the production of Genera Palmarum. He died the same year, leaving the work of completing the work to Natalie Uhl and John Dransfield.

Moore was the author of nearly 300 publications. He scientifically described and named the genus Dandya (in honor of James Edgar Dandy).

== Awards and fellowships ==
Moore received Guggenheim Fellowships in 1946–47 and 1955–56. He also received the Founder's Medal of the Fairchild Tropical Garden in 1954.

He was made an Honorary Life Member of the American Gloxinia and Gesneriad Society in 1958.
