= Manjekia =

Scientific classification
- Kingdom: Plantae
- Clade: Tracheophytes
- Clade: Angiosperms
- Clade: Monocots
- Clade: Commelinids
- Order: Arecales
- Family: Arecaceae
- Subfamily: Arecoideae
- Tribe: Areceae
- Subtribe: Ptychospermatinae
- Genus: Manjekia; W.J.Baker & Heatubun
- Species: M. maturbongsii

Binomial name
- Manjekia maturbongsii (W.J.Baker & Heatubun) W.J.Baker & Heatubun

Synonyms
- Adonidia maturbongsii W.J.Baker & Heatubun

Genus of palms

Manjekia is a monotypic genus of palm for a species of palm native to Biak island, Indonesia, off the northwest coast of New Guinea. The genus was proposed in 2014.

Its sole species is Manjekia maturbongsii, which was first described in 2012 as Adonidia maturbongsii. The specific epithet honours Rudi Maturbongs for his contributions to the study of palms in Biak. In 2014, the original authors decided that it was sufficiently distinct to be transferred from Adonidia to its own genus, Manjekia. The transfer has been accepted by sources such as Plants of the World Online.
