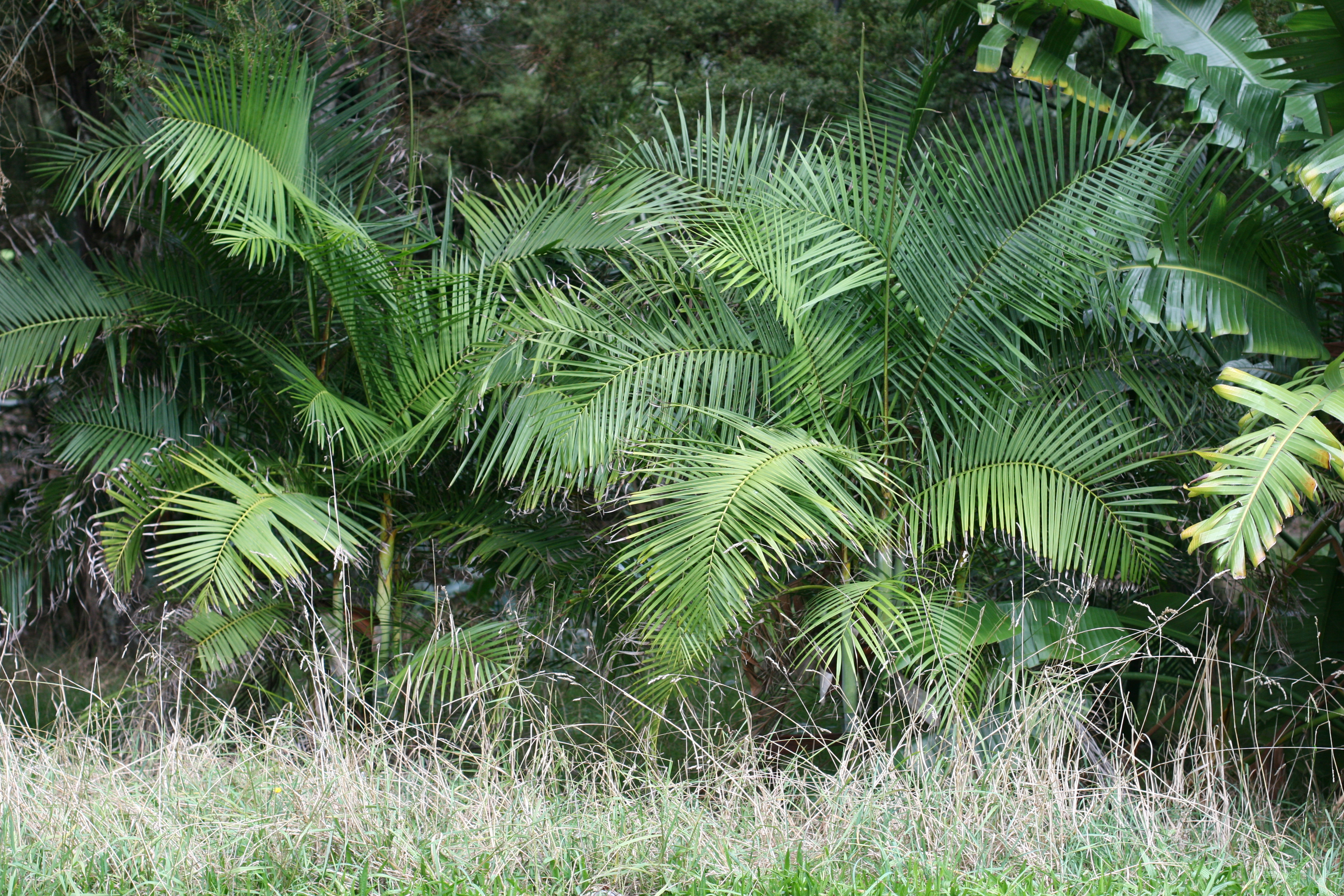
- Dypsis baronii

Scientific classification
- Kingdom: Plantae
- Clade: Tracheophytes
- Clade: Angiosperms
- Clade: Monocots
- Clade: Commelinids
- Order: Arecales
- Family: Arecaceae
- Subfamily: Arecoideae
- Tribe: Areceae
- Subtribe: Dypsidinae; Becc.

Synonyms
- Masoalinae

= Dypsidinae =

Subtribe of palms

Dypsidinae is a subtribe of plants in the family Arecaceae.

Genera:

- Dypsis: note restored genera:
  - Chrysalidocarpus
  - Vonitra
- Lemurophoenix
- Marojejya
- Masoala
