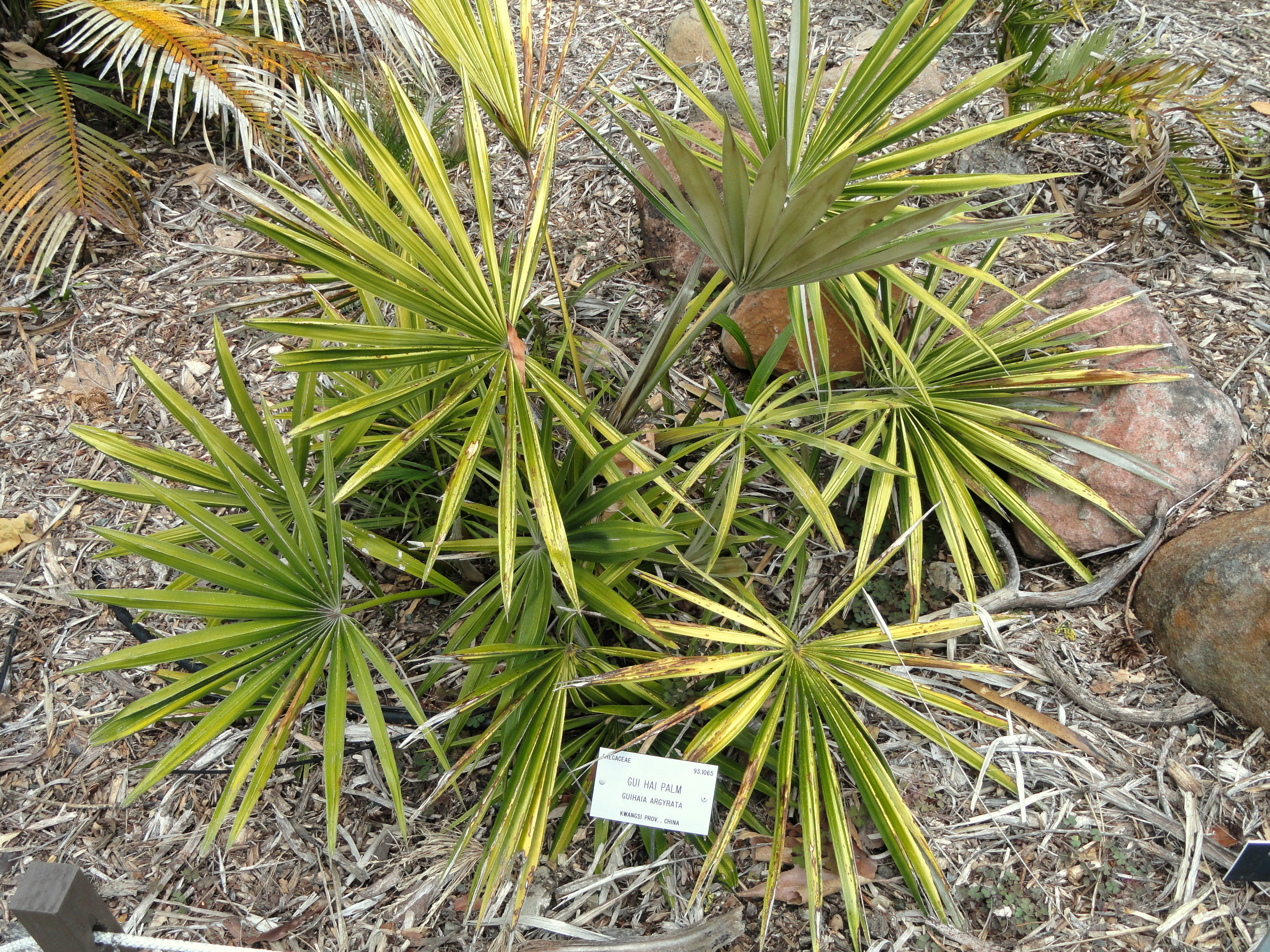
- Guihaia argyrata

Scientific classification
- Kingdom: Plantae
- Clade: Tracheophytes
- Clade: Angiosperms
- Clade: Monocots
- Clade: Commelinids
- Order: Arecales
- Family: Arecaceae
- Subfamily: Coryphoideae
- Tribe: Trachycarpeae
- Genus: Guihaia; J.Dransf., S.K.Lee & F.N.Wei

= Guihaia =

Genus of palms

Guihaia is a genus of three species of dioecious palms found in China and Vietnam. Perhaps its most distinctive characteristic is that it is the only palm with palmate leaves that has reduplicate (A-shaped) leaf folds. All other palmate leaves have induplicate (V-shaped) leaf folds. Guihaia lancifolia has undivided leaves.

== Species ==
Image	Scientific name	Distribution
	Guihaia argyrata (S.K.Lee & F.N.Wei) S.K.Lee, F.N.Wei & J.Dransf	China: Guizhou, Guangxi, Guangdong and Vietnam
	Guihaia grossefibrosa (Gagnep.) J.Dransf., S.K.Lee & F.N.Wei	China: Guangdong, Guangxi and Vietnam
	Guihaia heterosquama X. Y. Li	China: Chongqing; Fuling district
	Guihaia lancifolia K. W. Luo & F. W. Xing	China: Guangxi
