= Danjugan Island =

Island of the Philippines

- Location within Philippines

Geography
- Coordinates: 9°52′17″N 122°22′39″E
- Adjacent to: Panay Gulf; Sulu Sea

Administration
- Philippines
- Region: Negros Island Region
- Province: Negros Occidental
- Municipality: Cauayan

Additional information
- Time zone: PST (UTC+8)
- Official website: http://www.danjuganisland.ph/

Danjugan Island is a 43-hectare (110-acre) island under the jurisdiction of Cauayan, Negros Occidental, Philippines. The island is under the care of The Philippine Reef and Rainforest Conservation Foundation, Inc. (PRRCFI) which aims to promote awareness on biodiversity protection by means of ecotourism.

== Eco-Tourism ==
Danjugan is a rising ecotourism destination. With the efforts of PRRCFI, the island has become a sustainable tourism model wherein locals are involved in its preservation and conservation while welcoming tourists.

The island is a known nesting ground of Philippine megapod or scrubfowl, sea turtles, and fruit bats.
