= Natalie Whitford Uhl =

American botanist

- Born: Natalie B. Whitford; 1919
- Died: March 28, 2017 (aged 97–98); Georgia, USA
- Citizenship: United States of America
- Education: Rhode Island State College, Cornell University
- Spouse: Charles H. Uhl
- Scientific career
- Fields: Botany Palms
- Workplaces: L. H. Bailey Hortorium Herbarium
- Author abbrev. (botany): N.W.Uhl

Natalie Whitford Uhl (1919–2017) was an American botanist who specialised in palms.

The eldest of three sisters, she grew up on a farm in Rhode Island. She graduated B.S in 1940 from Rhode Island State College, publishing two papers on general plant morphology with Vernon Cheadle, her senior year advisor, the same year. In 1940 she went to Cornell University, earning her M.S. in 1943, and her Ph.D. in 1947. While at Cornell, she met and married her husband, Charles Uhl, abandoning botany to start a family.

Her work with palms began in 1963, when she returned to Cornell to work with Harold E. Moore, who was also the chief editor of Principes, the journal of the International Palm Society. She published her first article as sole author in 1966, on palm inflorescence morphology. In 1978, she and John Dransfield became associate editors of Principes, which later became Palms, and co-editors in 1980 with the death of Moore. She continued to co-edit it until 2000.

The Eocene fossil palm Uhlia allanbyensis was named in recognition of her work on palm taxonomy in 1994. The palm species Aphandra natalia was named in her honor in 1987.

== Published names ==
As a taxonomist, Uhl described twelve new species, all of them in conjunction with other palm taxonomists. She first described two species in conjunction with Dransfield in 1984; the two described another species two years later. She published nine new species in 1990, in conjunction with Donald Robert Hodel -these are all southern Central American dwarf palms in the genus Chamaedorea. Along with Dransfield, and in one case Anthony Kyle Irvine, she also published a handful of recombinations, notably moving the monotypic African Wissmannia carinensis to the East Asian and Australian Livistona. After the publication of their 1983 book Genera Palmarum, she and Dransfield formally described a number of the new infrageneric taxa proposed in it in a 1986 article. She is also credited as part of a large team which sequenced genetic code across the Arecaceae, and in 2005 created a few higher taxa to reclassify the infrageneric taxonomy.

- Halmoorea trispatha J.Dransf. & N.W.Uhl (1984)
- Marojejya darianii J.Dransf. & N.W.Uhl (1984)
- Ravenea moorei J.Dransf. & N.W.Uhl (1986)
- Chamaedorea correae Hodel & N.W.Uhl (1990)
- Chamaedorea guntheriana Hodel & N.W.Uhl (1990)
- Chamaedorea palmeriana Hodel & N.W.Uhl (1990)
- Chamaedorea pedunculata Hodel & N.W.Uhl (1990)
- Chamaedorea robertii Hodel & N.W.Uhl (1990)
- Chamaedorea sullivaniorum Hodel & N.W.Uhl (1990)
- Chamaedorea undulatifolia Hodel & N.W.Uhl (1990)
- Chamaedorea vistae Hodel & N.W.Uhl (1990)
- Chamaedorea whitelockiana Hodel & N.W.Uhl (1990)

== Awards ==
In 1999, Uhl was awarded the Dent Smith Memorial Award by the International Palm Society for her many decades of research on palms and for her contributions to the Society as journal editor and director of the Board. In 2002, she won the Asa Gray award, awarded by the American Society of Plant Taxonomists "for outstanding accomplishments pertinent to the goals of the society". She also received the Robert Allerton Award from the National Tropical Botanic Garden in 2003 in recognition of her lifetime achievements in botany.

== Selected works ==
- Moore, H.E.Jr. & Uhl, N.W. (1984). The indigenous palms of New Caledonia. Lawai, Kauai, Hawaii, Pacific Tropical Botanical Garden.
- Dransfield, J., Uhl, N.W., et al. (2008). Genera Palmarum: evolution and classification of palms. Second edition. Kew Publishing.

The standard author abbreviation N.W.Uhl is used to indicate this person as the author when citing a botanical name.
