= John Dransfield =

British botanist

- Known for: Botany; Taxonomy; Palm classification
- Spouse: Soejatmi Dransfield
- Scientific career
- Author abbrev. (botany): J.Dransf.

John Dransfield (born 1945) is former head of palm research at the Royal Botanic Gardens, Kew, United Kingdom.

Dransfield has written or contributed to several books on palms, notably both the first and second editions of Genera Palmarum. The first edition was the standard reference for palm evolution and classification and the second edition, expanding on the original, is expected to achieve that same benchmark.

He studied at the University of Cambridge, B.A.(1967) biology, M.A. (1970) botany and Ph.D. biology (1970) before working at Kew Gardens.

Dransfield was awarded the inaugural David Fairchild Medal for Plant Exploration in 1999, recognising him as the "world authority on the systematics of the palm family (Arecaceae)". In 2004, he was awarded the Linnean Medal, an annual award given by the Linnean Society of London. In 2023 Dr. Dransfield was the recipient of the Dent Smith Memorial Award, the highest accolade from the International Palm Society.

The genus Dransfieldia was named for him, as was the species Adonidia dransfieldii.

He married Soejatmi Dransfield (née Soejatmi Soenarko) in Malaysia (1977).

== Selected works ==
- The typification of Linnean palms. International Bureau for Plant Taxonomy and Nomenclature, 1979.
- A manual of the rattans of the Malay Peninsula. By John Dransfield. Forest Dept., Ministry of Primary Industries, Malaysia, 1979.
- The rattans of Sabah. By John Dransfield. Forest Dept. Sabah, 1984.
- Palmae. By John Dransfield. Published on behalf of the East African Governments by Balkema, 1986.
- Genera Palmarum: a classification of palms based on the work of Harold E. Moore, Jr. By Harold E. Moore, Natalie W. Uhl and John Dransfield. L.H. Bailey Hortorium, 1987.
- The palms of the New World: a conservation census. By John Dransfield, Dennis Victor Johnson and Hugh Synge. IUCN, 1988.
- The rattans of Sarawak. By John Dransfield. Royal Botanic Gardens, Kew, 1992.
- The palms of Madagascar. By John Dransfield and Henk Beentje. Royal Botanic Gardens and the International Palm Society, 1995.
- Priority species of bamboo and rattan. Edited by A. N. Rao, V. Ramanatha Rao, and J.T. Williams. Bioversity International, 1998.
- Corybas west of Wallace's Line. By John Dransfield. Royal Botanic Gardens, Kew, 2000.
- World checklist of palms. By Rafaël Govaerts and John Dransfield. Royal Botanic Gardens, Kew, 2005.
- Field guide to the palms of Madagascar. By John Dransfield. Royal Botanic Gardens, Kew, 2006.
- Field guide to the palms of New Guinea. By William J. Baker and John Dransfield. Royal Botanic Gardens, Kew, 2006.
- Genera Palmarum: the evolution and classification of palms. By John Dransfield and Natalie W. Uhl. Kew Pub., 2008. Received the 2009 Annual Literature Award of the Council on Botanical and Horticultural Libraries.
- Dransfield, John (10 June 2010). Growth forms of rain forest palms. pp. 247–268. ISBN 9780521142472., in Tomlinson & Zimmerman (1978)
- Beyond Genera Palmarum: progress and prospects in palm systematics By William J. Baker & J Dransfield. 2016. Oxford Academy, Botanical Journal of the Linnean Society,2016, 182, 207–233 ISSN 1095-8339

== See also ==
- Harold E. Moore
- Natalie Whitford Uhl

== Bibliography ==
- "Dransfield John". Board of Trustees of the Royal Botanic Gardens, Kew. Archived from the original on 16 June 2011.
- Tomlinson, P. B.; Zimmerman, Martin, eds. (1978). Tropical Trees as Living Systems (Proceedings of the fourth Cabot Symposium held at Harvard Forest, Petersham Massachusetts on April 26–30, 1976). Cambridge University Press. ISBN 978-0-521-14247-2.
