= Wait-a-while =

Wait-a-while may refer to:

- Acacia colletioides, also called pin bush and spine bush
- Acacia cuspidifolia, also called bohemia
- Acacia nyssophylla, also called pin bush and spine bush
- Calamus arauensis, also called Bamaga wait-a-while
- Calamus australis, also called hairy mary and lawyer cane
- Calamus caryotoides, also called fish-tail lawyer cane
- Calamus moti, also called yellow lawyer cane
- Calamus muelleri, also called southern lawyer cane
- Calamus vitiensis, also called Mission Beach wait-a-while and Dunk Island lawyer vine
- Calamus warburgii, also called Iron Range wait-a-while
- Smilax australis, also called austral sarsaparilla and lawyer vine

== See also ==
- Wait-a-minute tree
- Lawyer vine
- Lawyer cane
