= Lawyer cane =

Lawyer cane may refer to:

- Calamus australis
- Calamus caryotoides
- Calamus moti
- Calamus muelleri
- Calamus radicalis

== See also ==
- Lawyer vine
