= Lawyer vine =

Lawyer vine may refer to:

- Calamus australis
- Calamus muelleri
- Calamus vitiensis
- Flagellaria indica
- Smilax australis

== See also ==
- Lawyer cane
