= Wait-a-minute tree =

Wait-a-minute tree, wait-a-bit tree, or wait-a-bit plant are common names for a variety of prickly plants that catch onto passers-by. These names come from the fact that the stems or other parts of the plant have numerous hooked thorns that tend to hook onto passers-by; the hooked person must stop ("wait a minute") to remove the thorns carefully to avoid injury or shredded clothing.

These names can refer to:

- Senegalia brevispica
- Senegalia greggii
- Some species of Asparagus
- Caesalpinia decapetala
- Mimosa aculeaticarpa

== See also ==
- Bush lawyer (plant)
- Smilax australis, lawyer vine
- Calamus australis, lawyer cane
- Clusia rosea, Scotch attorney
- Solanum atropurpureum, five-minute plant
- Wait-a-while
