= Senegalia brevispica =

Conservation status
- Least Concern (IUCN 3.1)

Scientific classification
- Kingdom: Plantae
- Clade: Tracheophytes
- Clade: Angiosperms
- Clade: Eudicots
- Clade: Rosids
- Order: Fabales
- Family: Fabaceae
- Subfamily: Caesalpinioideae
- Clade: Mimosoid clade
- Genus: Senegalia
- Species: S. brevispica

Binomial name
- Senegalia brevispica (Harms) Seigler & Ebinger
- IUCN distribution (2018)

Synonyms
- Synonymy: Acacia brevispica Harms; Acacia pennata Baker.f.; Acacia pennata E.Mey.

Thorn bush native to East Africa

Senegalia brevispica is a species of wait-a-bit thorn bush native to East Africa.

== Habitat and distribution ==
Senegalia brevispica is endemic to forested habitat types in East Africa, viz. Angola, Burundi, Central African Republic, the Democratic Republic of the Congo, Ethiopia, Kenya, Malawi, Mozambique, Rwanda, Somalia, South Sudan, the United Republic of Tanzania and Uganda. It is also found in South Africa.

== Conservation status ==
Senegalia brevispica is classified as least concern due to its widespread distribution, large population and no apparent threats to the species.

== Taxonomy ==
Senegalia brevispica contains the following 3 subspecies:

- Senegalia brevispica brevispica
- Senegalia brevispica schweinfurthii
- Senegalia brevispica dregeana (the prickly thorn)

== Names ==
Common names for Senegalia brevispica include prickly acacia and prickly thorn in English, dorinkie-doring in Afrikaans, and ubobhe and umthathawe in Zulu.
