= Flora Brasiliensis =

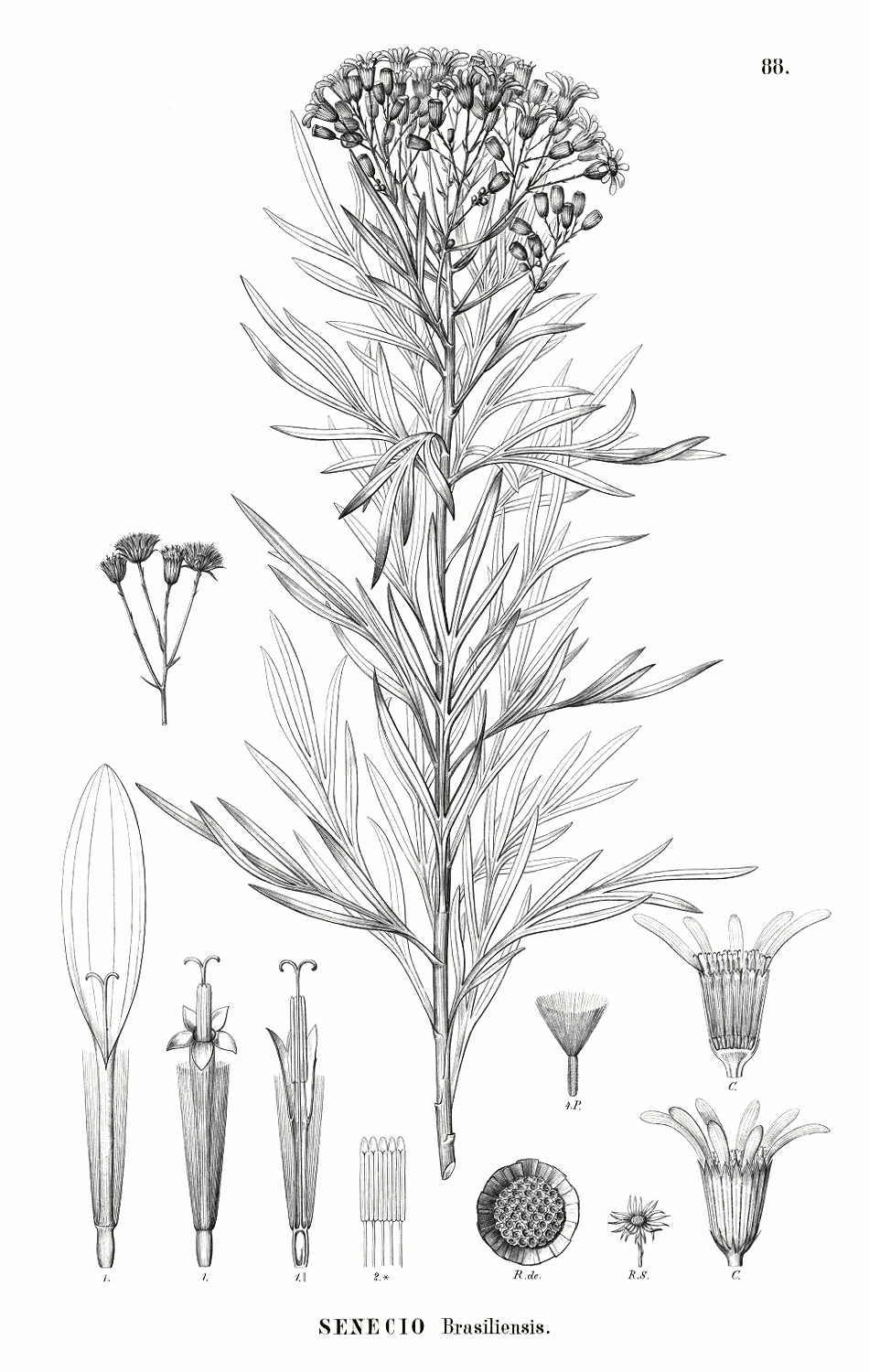
- Illustration of Senecio brasiliensis from Flora Brasiliensis
- Author: Carl Friedrich Philipp von Martius, Stephan Endlicher, August Wilhelm Eichler and Ignatz Urban (main authors)
- Publication date: Between 1840 and 1906
- Media type: Print
- Pages: 10,367

Flora Brasiliensis is a 15-volume book published between 1840 and 1906 by the editors Carl Friedrich Philipp von Martius, August Wilhelm Eichler, Ignatz Urban and many others. It contains taxonomic treatments of 22,767 species, mostly Brazilian angiosperms.

The work was begun by Stephan Endlicher and Martius. Von Martius completed 46 of the 130 fascicles before his death in 1868, with the monograph being completed in 1906.

It was published by the Missouri Botanical Garden.

== Book's structure ==
This Flora's volumes are an attempt to systematically categorise the known plants of the region.

- 15 volumes
  - 40 parts
    - 10,367 pages

== See also ==
- Historia naturalis palmarum
