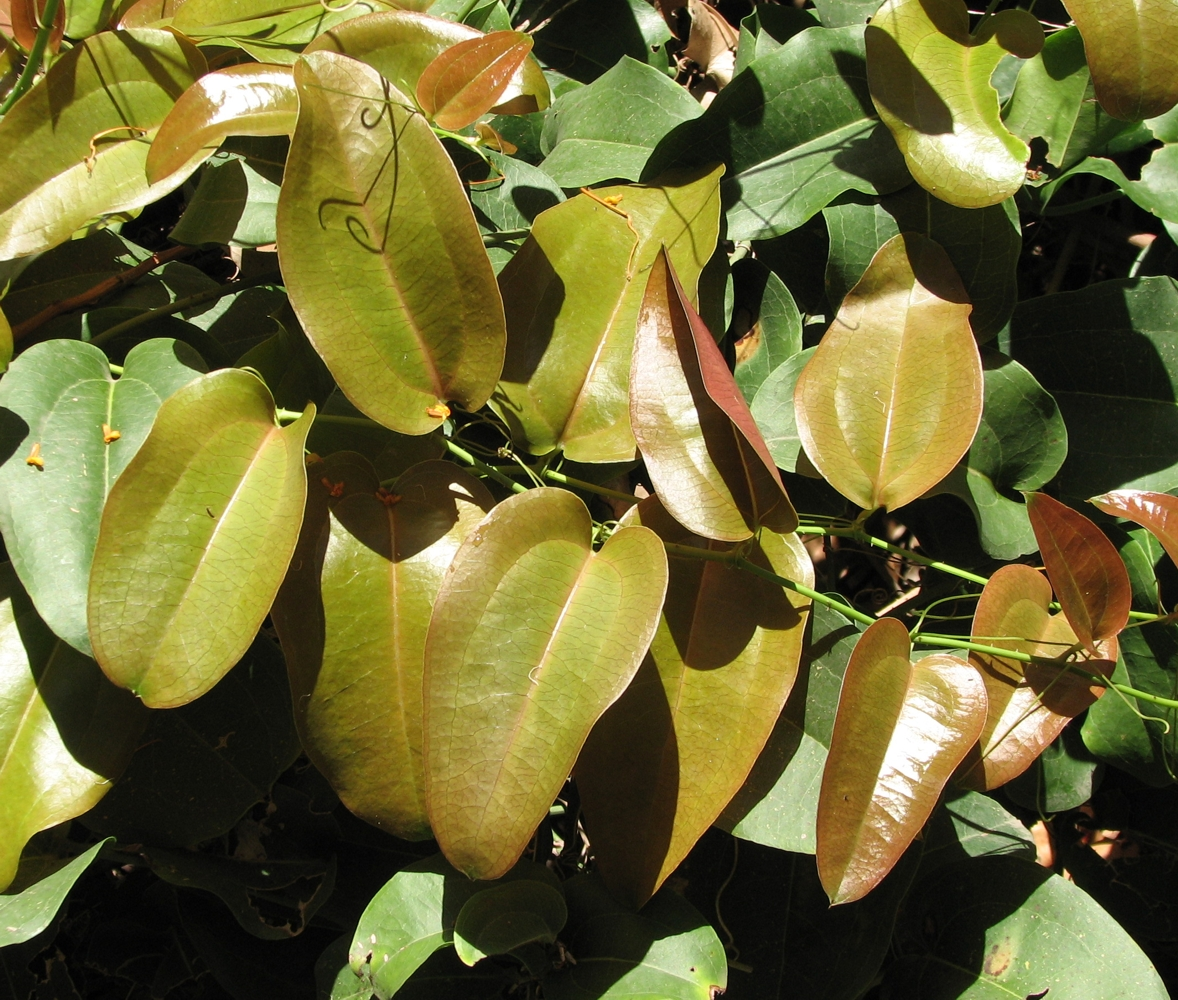

Scientific classification
- Kingdom: Plantae
- Clade: Embryophytes
- Clade: Tracheophytes
- Clade: Spermatophytes
- Clade: Angiosperms
- Clade: Monocots
- Order: Liliales
- Family: Smilacaceae
- Genus: Smilax
- Species: S. australis

Binomial name
- Smilax australis R.Br.

Synonyms
- Smilax latifolia R.Br.; Smilax spinescens Miq.; Smilax latifolia var. crassinervia A.DC.

= Smilax australis =

Lawyer vine

Species of vine

Smilax australis (lawyer vine, austral sarsaparilla, barbwire vine, or "wait-a-while") is a vine in the family Smilacaceae, endemic to Australia. It has prickly climbing stems that are up to 8 metres long with coiled tendrils that are up to 20 cm long. The glossy leaves have 5 prominent longitudinal veins and are 5 to 15 cm long and 3 to 10 cm wide.

== Distribution ==
The species occurs in rainforest, sclerophyll forest, woodland and heathland in the Northern Territory, Queensland, New South Wales, Victoria, Lord Howe Island, and the northeastern corner of Western Australia.

== See also ==
- Wait-a-minute tree
