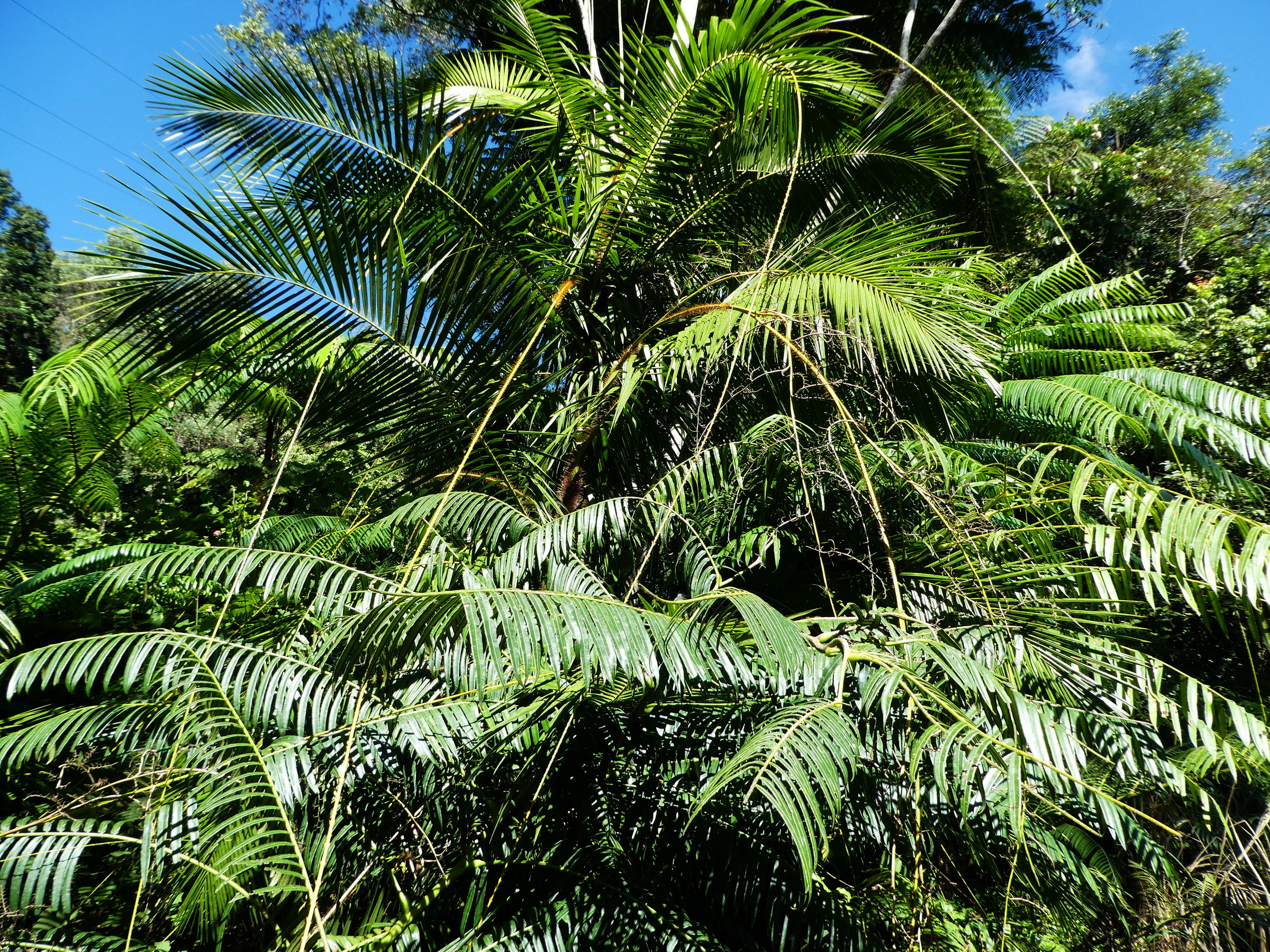

Conservation status
- Least Concern (NCA)

Scientific classification
- Kingdom: Plantae
- Clade: Tracheophytes
- Clade: Angiosperms
- Clade: Monocots
- Clade: Commelinids
- Order: Arecales
- Family: Arecaceae
- Genus: Calamus
- Species: C. radicalis

Binomial name
- Calamus radicalis H.Wendl. & Drude
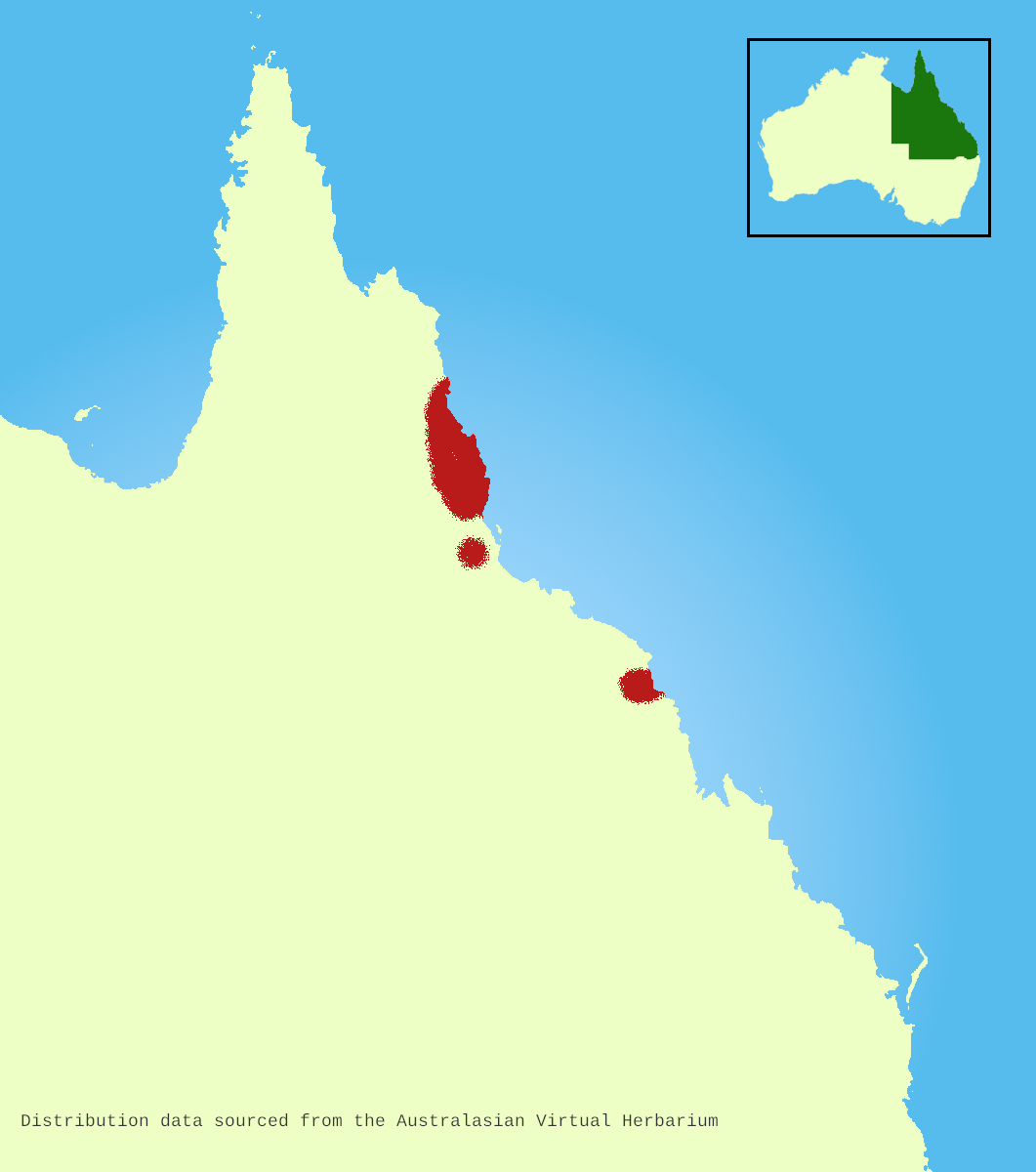

Synonyms
- Palmijuncus radicalis (H.Wendl. & Drude) Kuntze

= Calamus radicalis =

Vicious hairy mary

Species of flowering plant

Calamus radicalis, commonly known as vicious hairy mary, is a plant in the palm family Arecaceae endemic to the rainforests of northeast Queensland, Australia. Like other species in the genus Calamus, this is a climbing plant with a very long and flexible stem. It uses sharp strong hooks on the fronds and tendrils to attach itself to other vegetation, such as taller established trees, thus gaining support that enables it to grow higher towards the canopy. This species is very similar to C. australis, with which it coexists, but is larger in almost all respects.

== Description ==
This species has a clustering habit, i.e. several stems are produced from the same base. Stems may reach lengths of up to 40 m (130 ft) and a diameter of 4 cm (1.6 in). The leaves (or fronds) are produced on the youngest part of the stem, and the older sections are bare as the leaves age and fall off (exactly the same process as the more familiar upright palm with a stout stem). The older, leafless part of the stem of Calamus radicalis is smooth and glossy green.

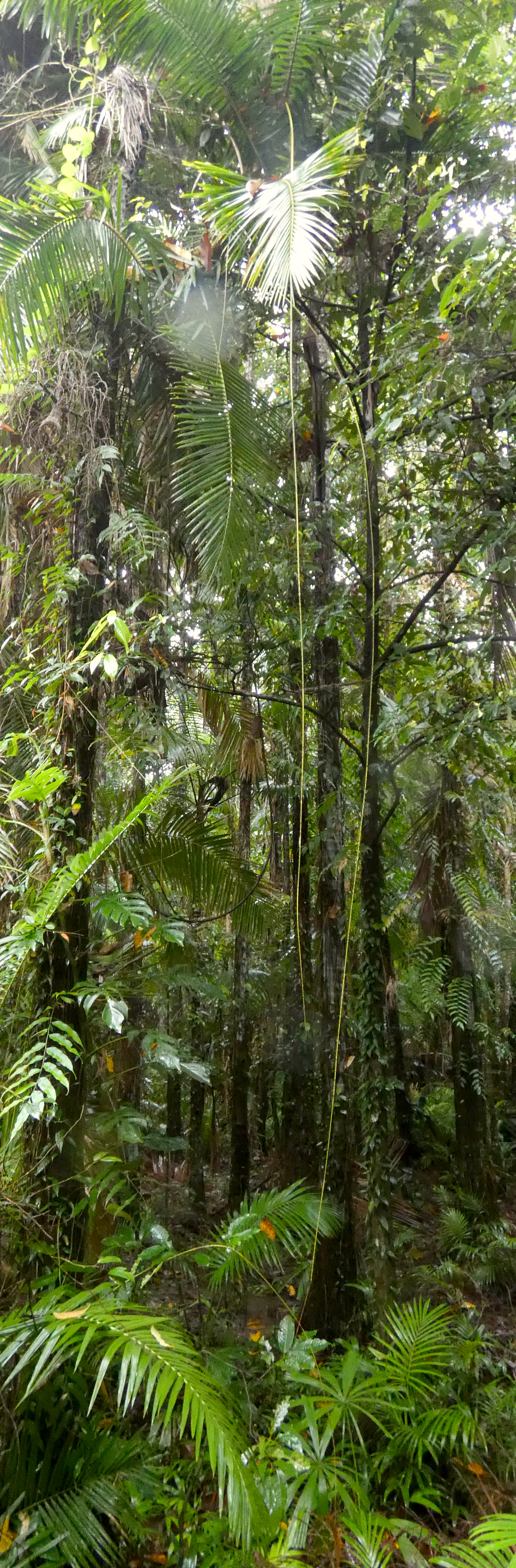
Dangling tendrils, approximately 6 metres long

The leaves have a long leaf sheath clasping the stem, which is densely covered with needle-like spines measuring 5 cm (2.0 in) or more. Tendrils, measuring several metres in length and armed with many large, stout, recurved barbs, are produced from the leaf sheath. The leaf itself is pinnate, up to 3 m (10 ft) in length, and has 30 to 55 pairs of leaflets. Leaves are armed with stout recurved barbs on both upper and lower surfaces of the rachis, and with fine, short — 15 mm (0.6 in) — spines on the upper surface of the leaflets. The overall outline of the frond is elliptic and the longest leaflets are at the midpoint, measuring about 50 cm (20 in) long by 3 cm (1.2 in) wide.

The inflorescences are large pendulous panicles measuring several metres in length, carrying either staminate (functionally male) or pistillate (functionally female) flowers.

Fruits are globose, around 10 mm (0.4 in) diameter, with a scaly exterior. They contain a single round seed which is surrounded by a thin layer of soft edible flesh.

== Taxonomy ==
Calamus radicalis was first described in 1875 by Hermann Wendland and Carl Georg Oscar Drude in their work Palmae Australasicae, published in the journal Linnaea: Ein Journal für die Botanik in ihrem ganzen Umfange, oder Beiträge zur Pflanzenkunde. The type specimen was collected near the Russell River in Queensland.

== Distribution and habitat ==
This species is restricted to coastal parts of northeast Queensland, from Cape Tribulation southwards to near Mackay. It grows in well developed lowland and highland rainforest, reaching its best development on soils derived from volcanic rocks. The altitudinal range is from sea level to about 800 m (2,600 ft).

== Conservation ==
This species is listed by the Queensland Department of Environment and Science as least concern. As of 9 December 2022, it has not been assessed by the IUCN.

== Gallery ==
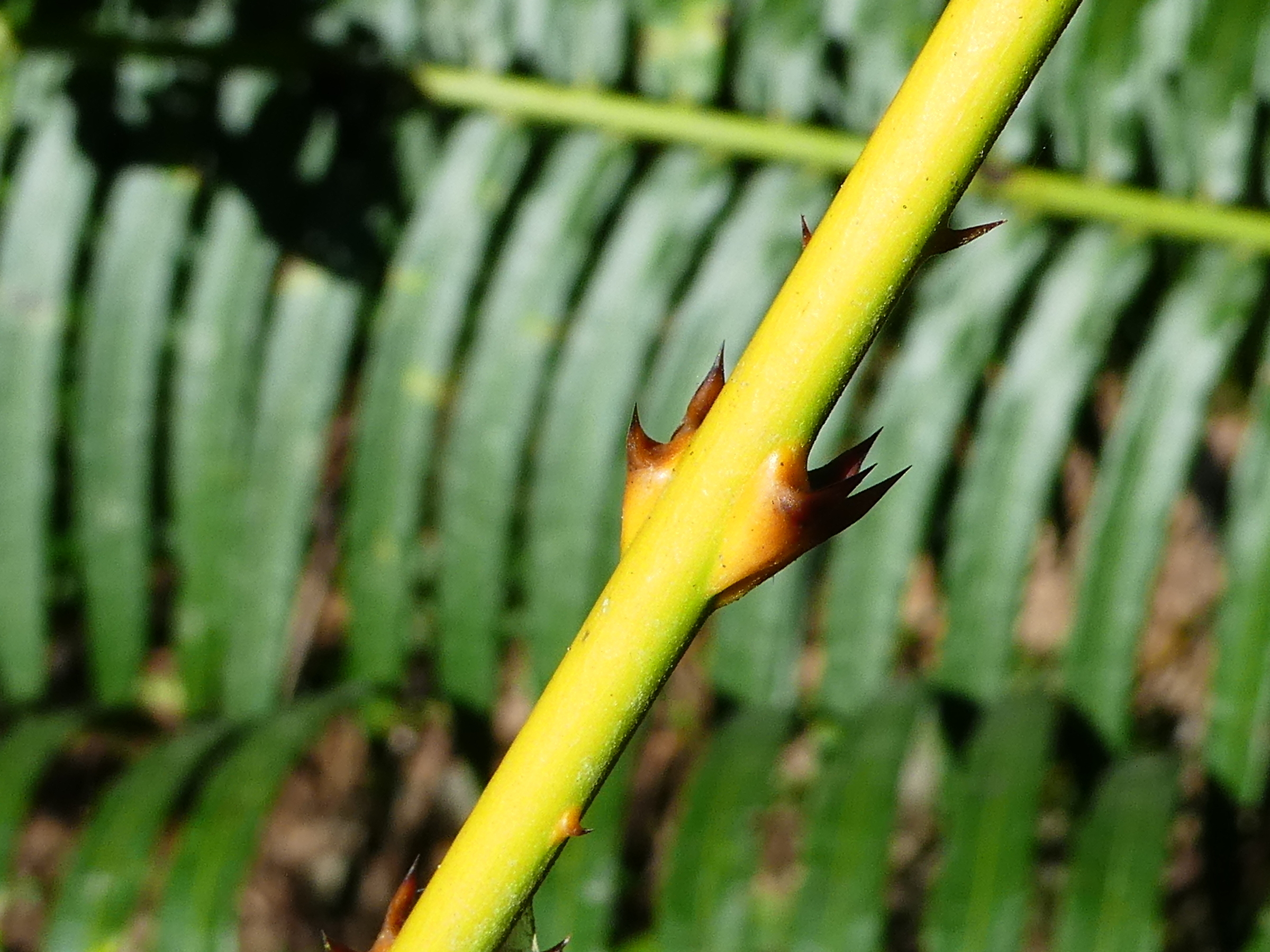
Tendril, displaying strong sharp hooks

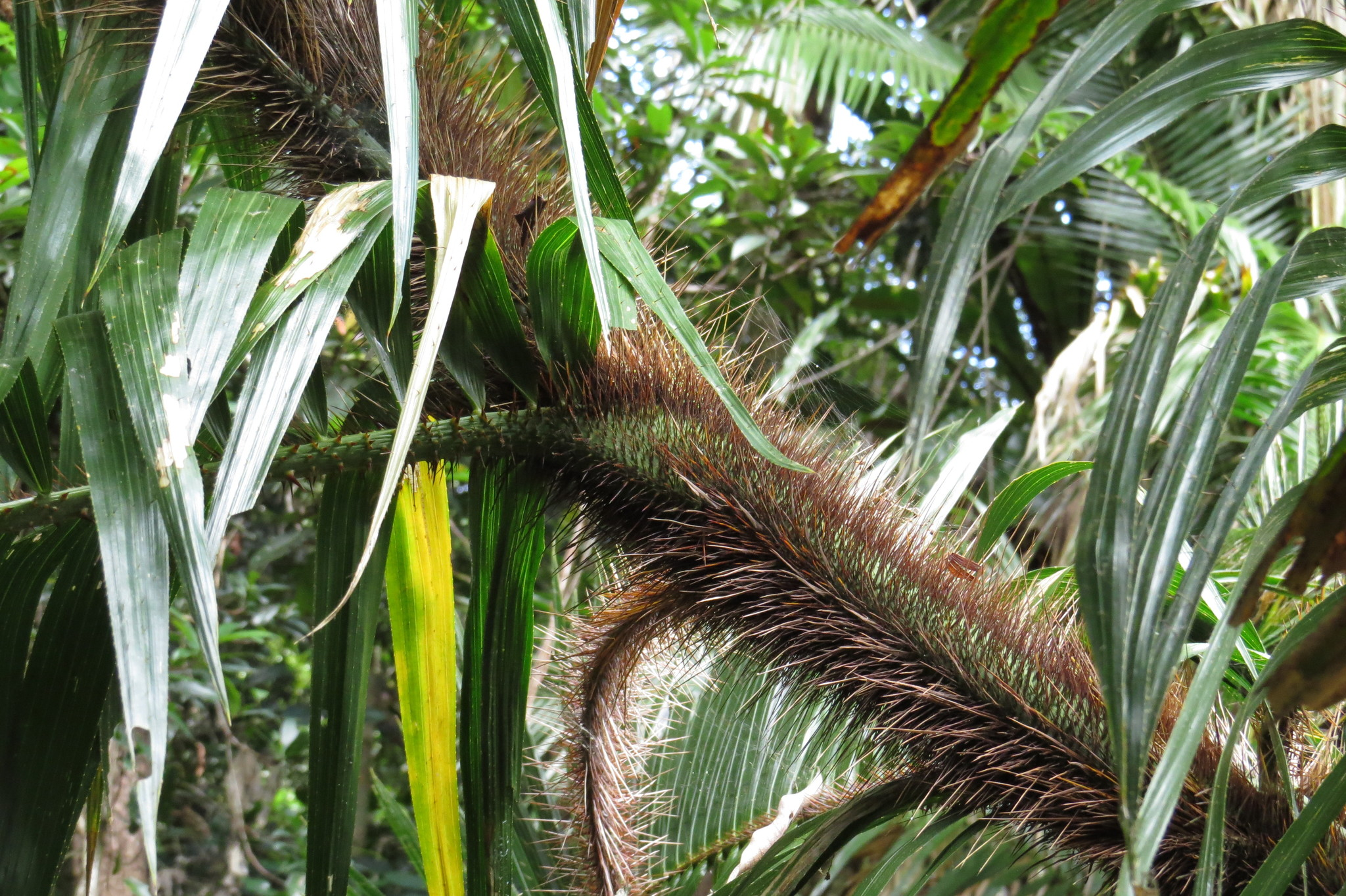
Stem, showing the densely packed spines on the leaf sheath

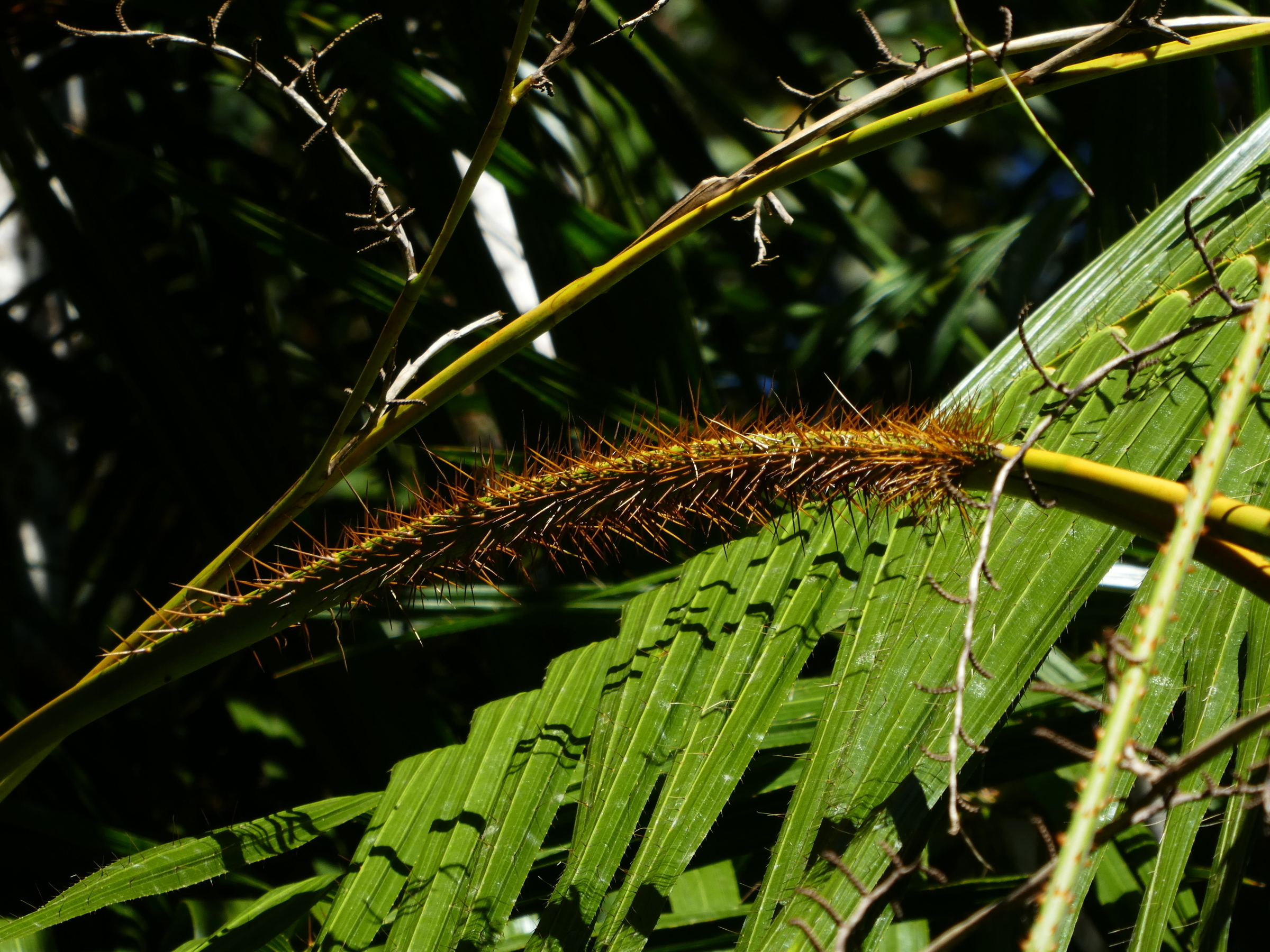
Stem and leaflets, both with spines

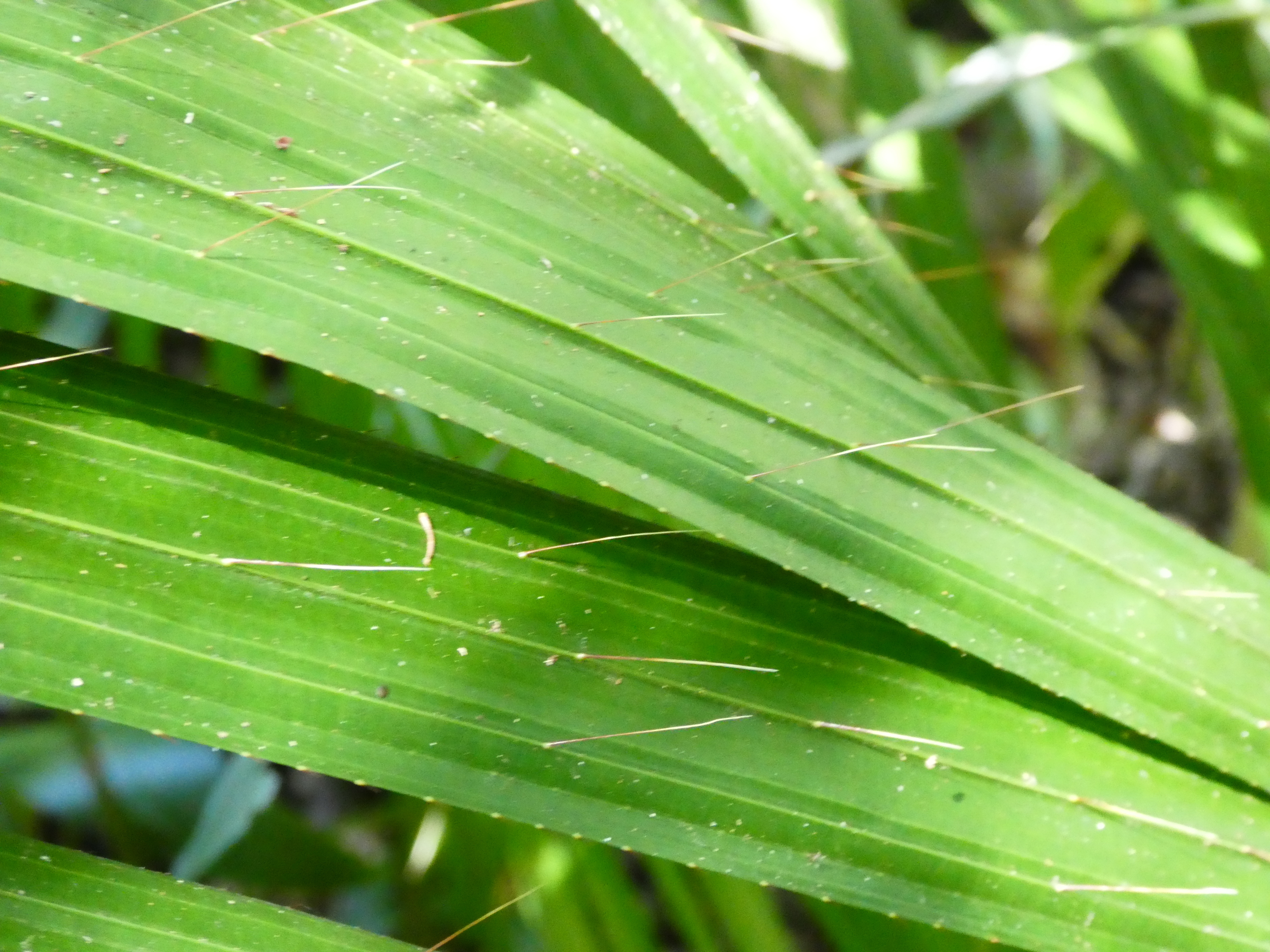
Closeup of leaflets, showing the spines arranged in three longitudinal rows
