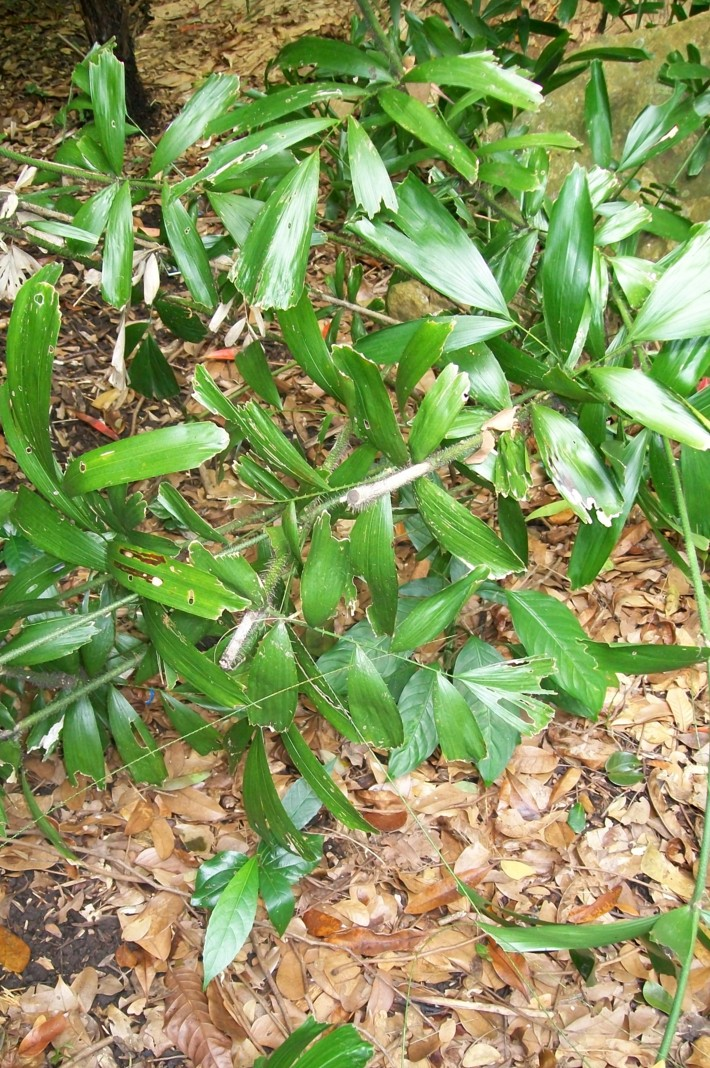

Conservation status
- Least Concern (NCA)

Scientific classification
- Kingdom: Plantae
- Clade: Tracheophytes
- Clade: Angiosperms
- Clade: Monocots
- Clade: Commelinids
- Order: Arecales
- Family: Arecaceae
- Genus: Calamus
- Species: C. caryotoides

Binomial name
- Calamus caryotoides A.Cunn. ex Mart.

Synonyms
- Palmijuncus caryotoides (A.Cunn. ex Mart.) Kuntze

= Calamus caryotoides =

Fish-tail lawyer cane

Species of palm

Calamus caryotoides, commonly known as fish-tail lawyer cane, is a climbing palm native to Queensland, Australia. Its habitat is rainforest and monsoon forest.

== Description ==
Calamus caryotoides has a slender, flexible stem up to 2 cm (0.8 in) diameter and 15 m (49 ft) long. Older parts of the stem, where the leaves have fallen, are green and smooth. The leaf sheathes measure about 15 cm (5.9 in) long and are covered in numerous dark spines up to 1 cm (0.4 in) long. A barbed tendril emerges from the leaf sheath on the opposite side to the petiole. The leaves are about 40 cm (16 in) long and compound, i.e. they are divided into leaflets, and both the rachis and leaflets carry small barbs. The leaflets are about 16 cm (6.3 in) long and 3 cm (1.2 in) wide at the distal end, but quite narrow at the junction with the rachis. The distal end is praemorse, i.e. shaped like a fish tail.

The inflorescence is pendulous, branched, and up to 2.5 m (8 ft 2 in) long, and each carries either male or female flowers. The fruit is small and round, about 10 mm (0.4 in) in diameter. The outer covering consists of numerous scales that slightly overlap each other, in the manner of a snake skin. A small amount of soft pulp lies beneath, surrounding the single globose seed which measures about 8 mm (0.3 in) diameter.

== Taxonomy ==
This species first became known to Western science in 1770, when a non-flowering specimen was collected by Joseph Banks during the first voyage of James Cook. In 1820 a fertile specimen was collected and eventually described by the English botanist and explorer Allan Cunningham, however his description was invalidly published, and so it wasn't until 1850 that a formal, valid description was published by the German botanist Carl Friedrich Philipp von Martius in volume three of his book Historia naturalis palmarum.

== Distribution and habitat ==
The fish-tail lawyer cane is found from near the top of Cape York Peninsula, southwards along the coastal regions to about Mount Elliott near Townsville. It grows in rainforest, gallery forest, and drier forest types, at altitudes from near sea level to about 1,500 m (4,900 ft).

== Traditional uses ==
The Kuku Yalanji people of the Mossman area used this plant mainly for basket weaving. The Cairns Botanical Gardens records that the Yidinydji, Yirrganyydji, Djabuganydji, and Gungganyji use this plant as follows:

The thin flexible trunks of this (and other) climbing palm made ideal building frames, or rope and string when split. The young shoots were eaten to cure headaches.

It is known to Yidinydji as Bugul, pronounced BOOK-KOOL.

== Gallery ==
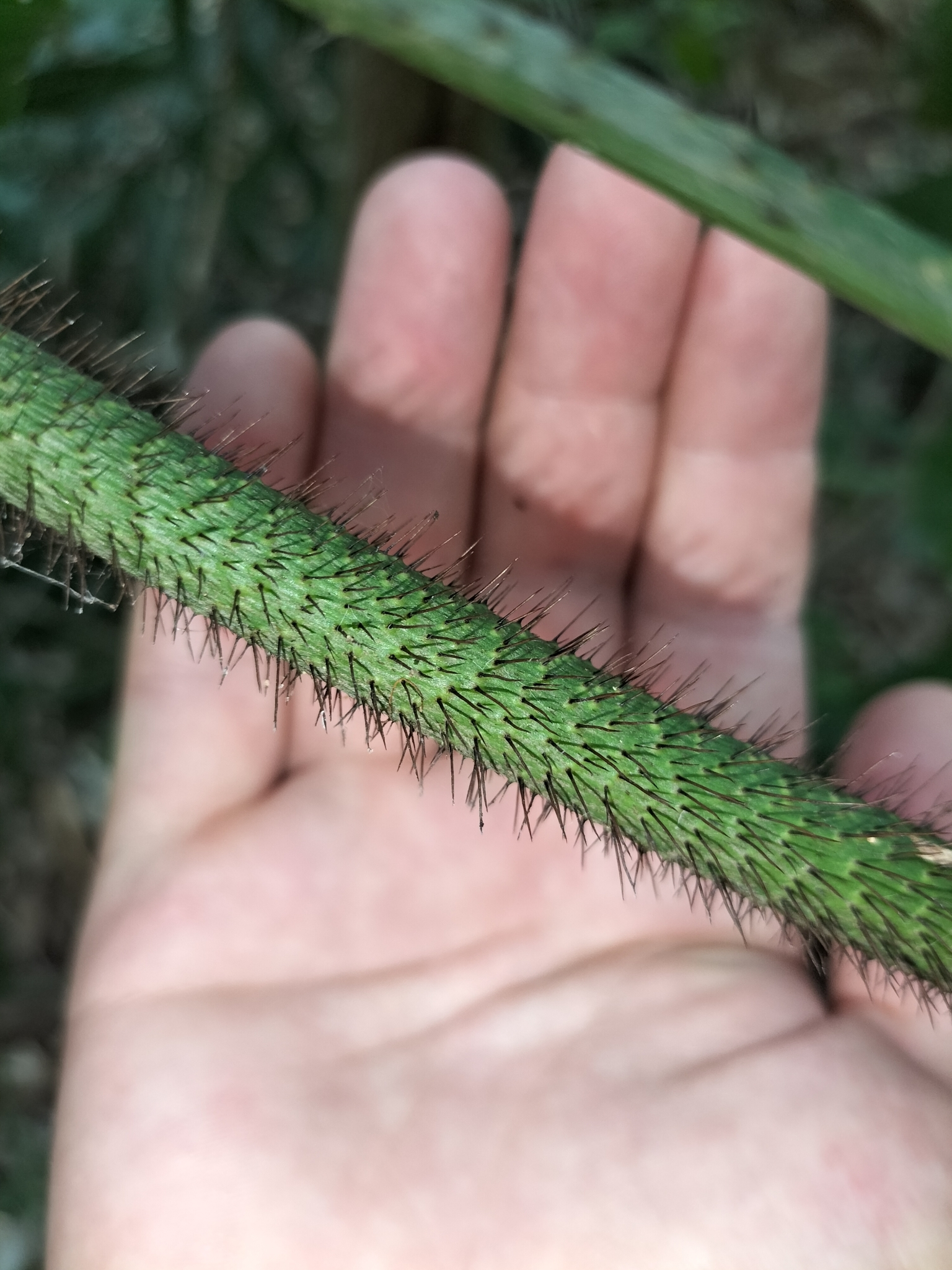
Spines on the leaf sheath

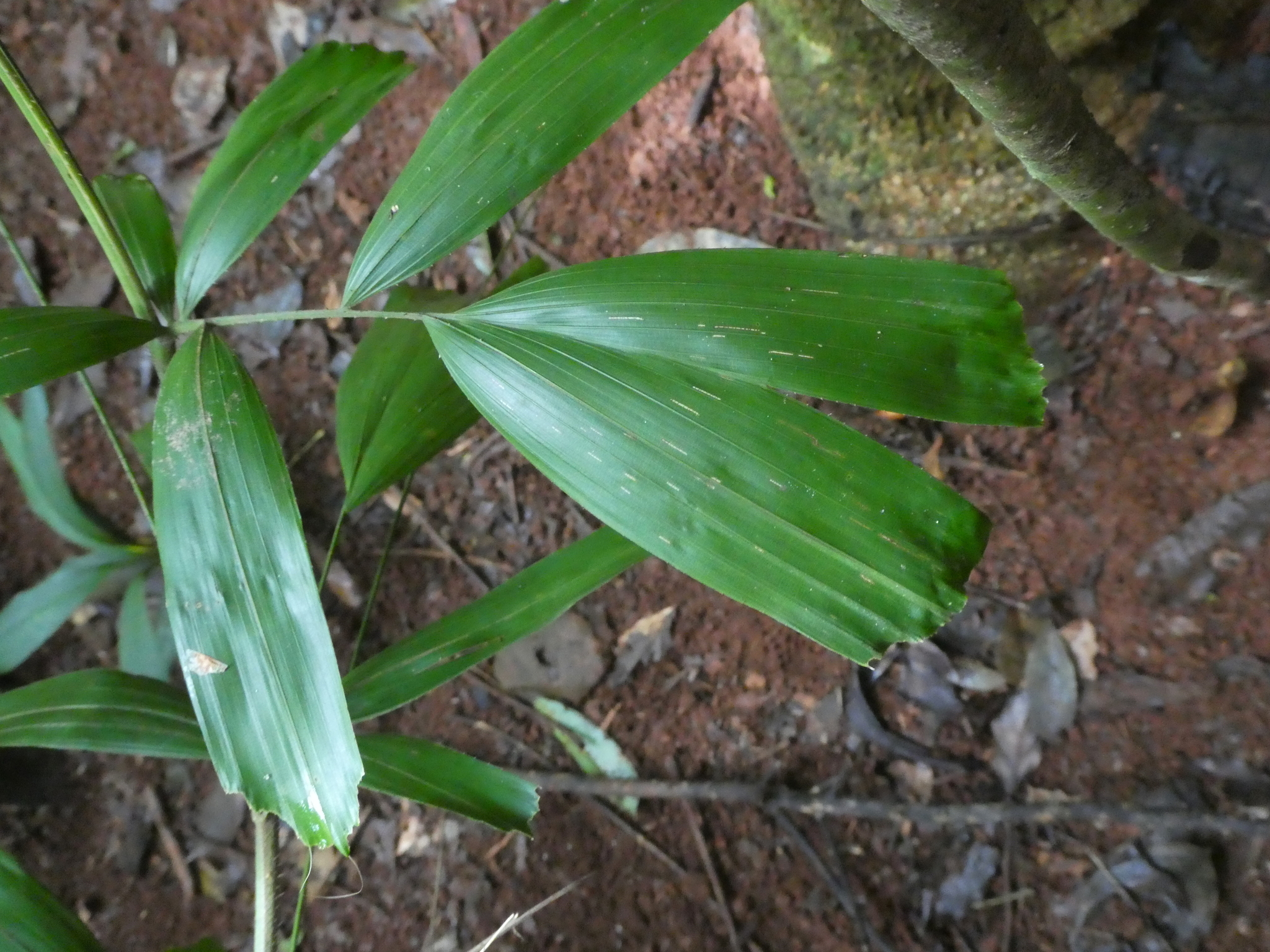
The compound leaf

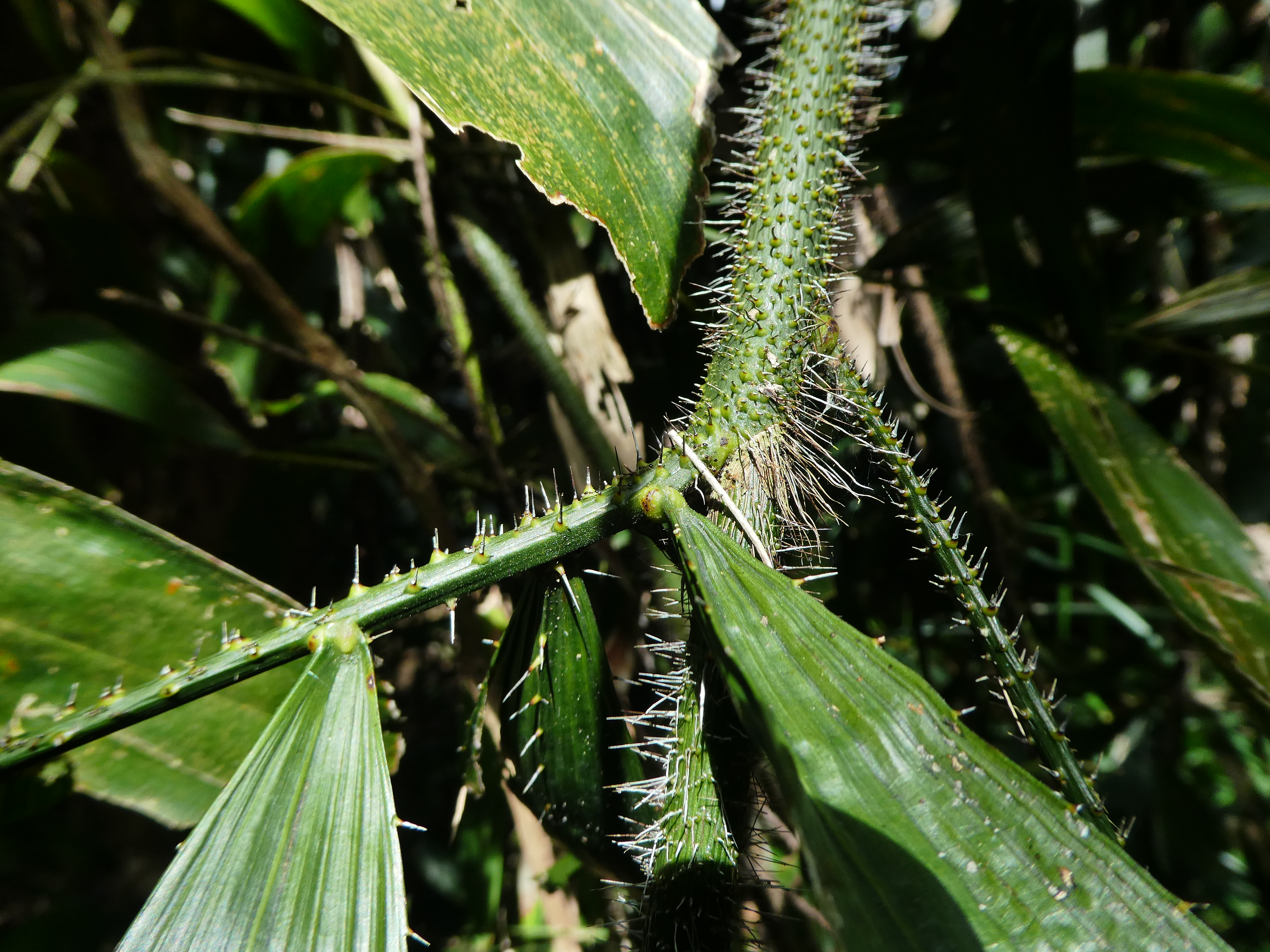
Top of the leaf sheath, with petiole (L) and tendril (R). Note, this stem is hanging upside down.

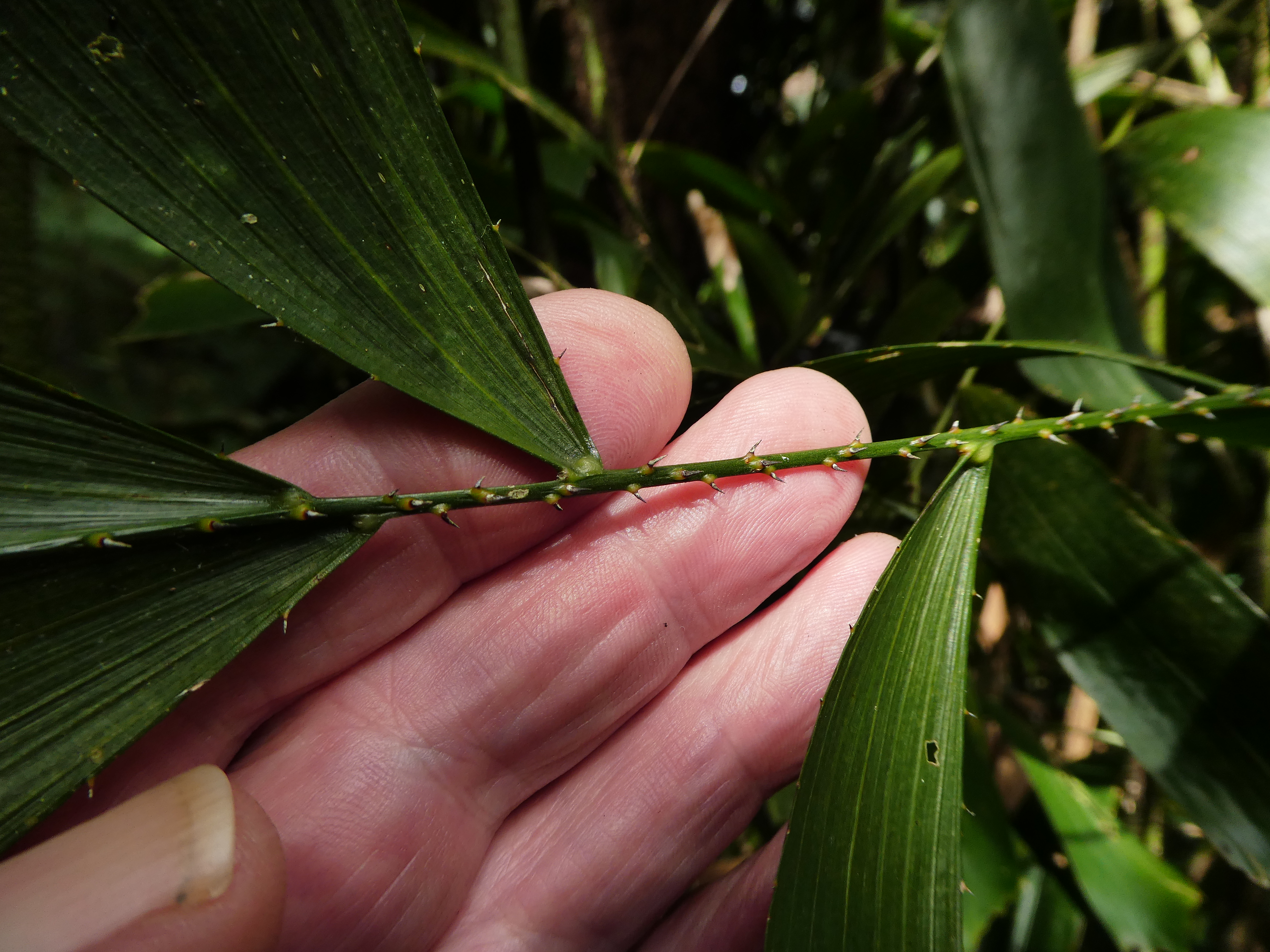
Rachis and leaflet bases with barbs

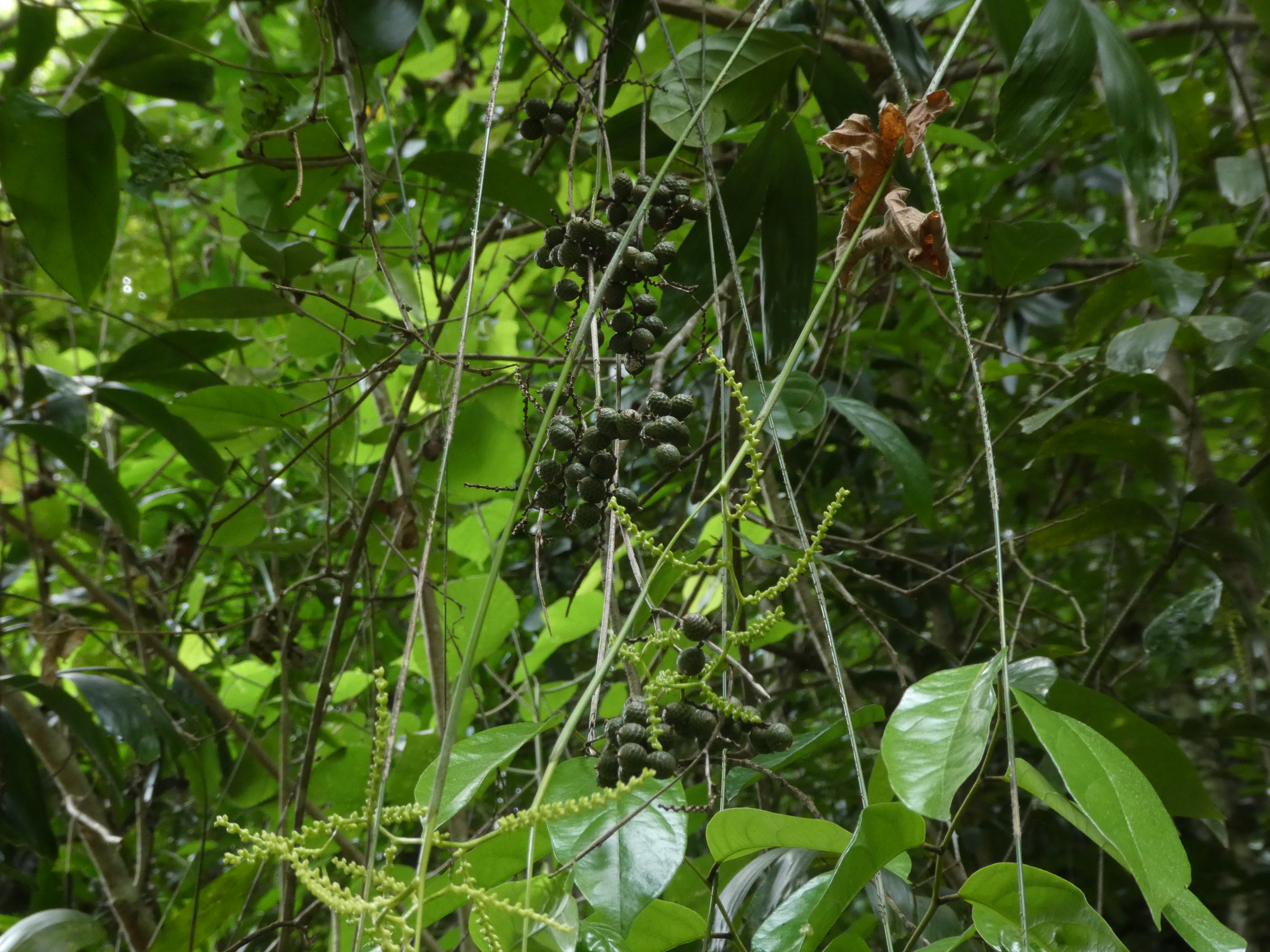
Flower buds and immature fruit
