= Historia naturalis palmarum =

Botanical book by Carl Friedrich Philipp von Martius

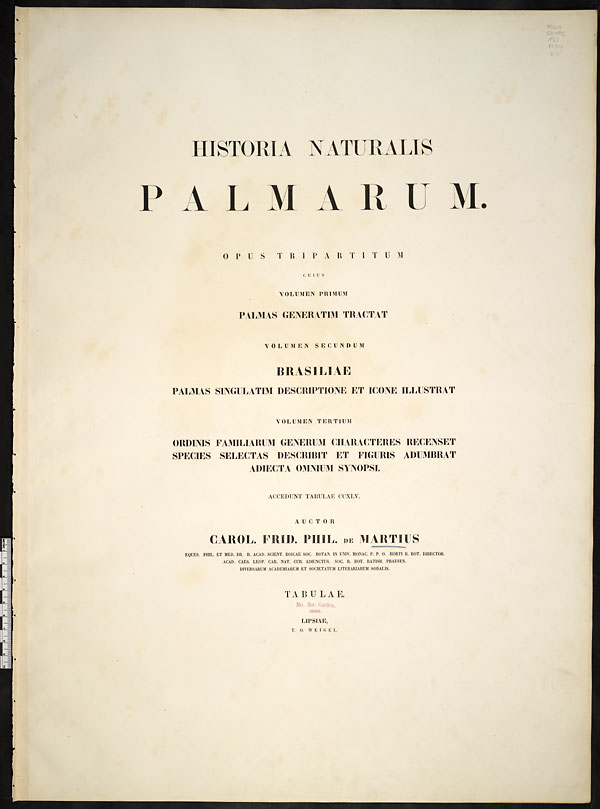
Title page of Volume one of Historia naturalis palmarum

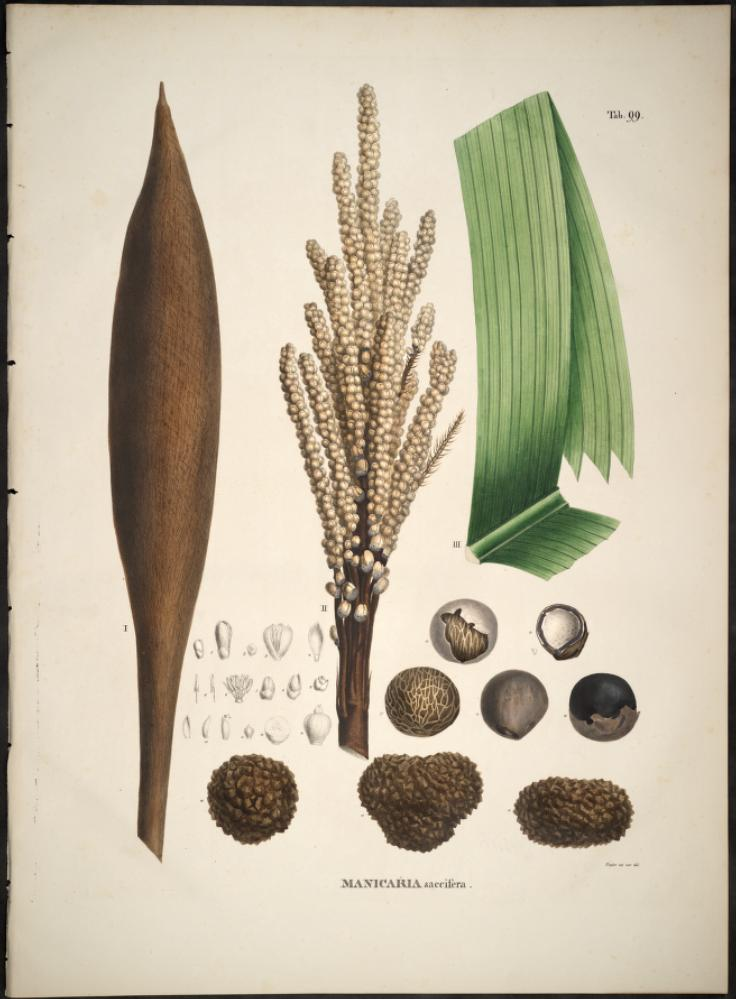
Sample plate. Manicaria saccifera

Historia naturalis palmarum: opus tripartitum ("Natural History of Palms, a work in three volumes") is a highly illustrated, three-volume botanical book of palms (Arecaceae) by German botanist Carl Friedrich Philipp von Martius. The work is in Latin and was published in imperial folio format in Leipzig (Lipsiae) by T.O. Weigel, volume one in 1823 and the final volume in 1850. It includes more than 550 pages of text and 240 chromolithographs, including views of habitats and botanical dissections.

Historia naturalis palmarum was based on Martius' travels in Brazil and Peru with zoologist Johann Baptist von Spix from 9 December 1817 to 1820. Their expedition was sponsored by the King of Bavaria, Maximilian I, with instructions to investigate natural history and tribal Indians. The pair travelled over 2,250 km (1,400 mi) throughout the Amazon Basin, the most species-rich palm region in the world, collecting and sketching specimens. They began in Rio de Janeiro and São Paulo before making their way north and inland. They became the first non-Portuguese Europeans to obtain permission to visit the Brazilian Amazon.

On their return to Bavaria, the King awarded both men knighthoods and lifetime pensions.

In the first volume, Martius outlined the modern classification of palms and prepared the first maps of palm biogeography. The second volume described the palms of Brazil, and in the third, known as Expositio Systematica, he systematically described all known genera of the palm family, based on his own work and that of others.

The majority of drawings of palms for the second volume, dedicated to Brazilian palms, were credited to Martius, with just a few landscapes, representing areas not travelled by Martius, taken from works by Frans Post and Johann Moritz Rugendas.

The book was reprinted in two volumes in 1971.

Other works by Martius based on the expedition were Reise in Brasilien (Journey in Brazil), published in three volumes in 1823, 1828 and 1831, and the massive 40-volume monograph Flora Brasiliensis which was completed by others in 1906.

E. J. H. Corner (1966) described the book as "the most magnificent treatment of palms that has been produced" Alexander von Humboldt said of the work and author: "For as long as palms are named and known, the name of Martius will be famous."

== See also ==
- Genera Palmarum
