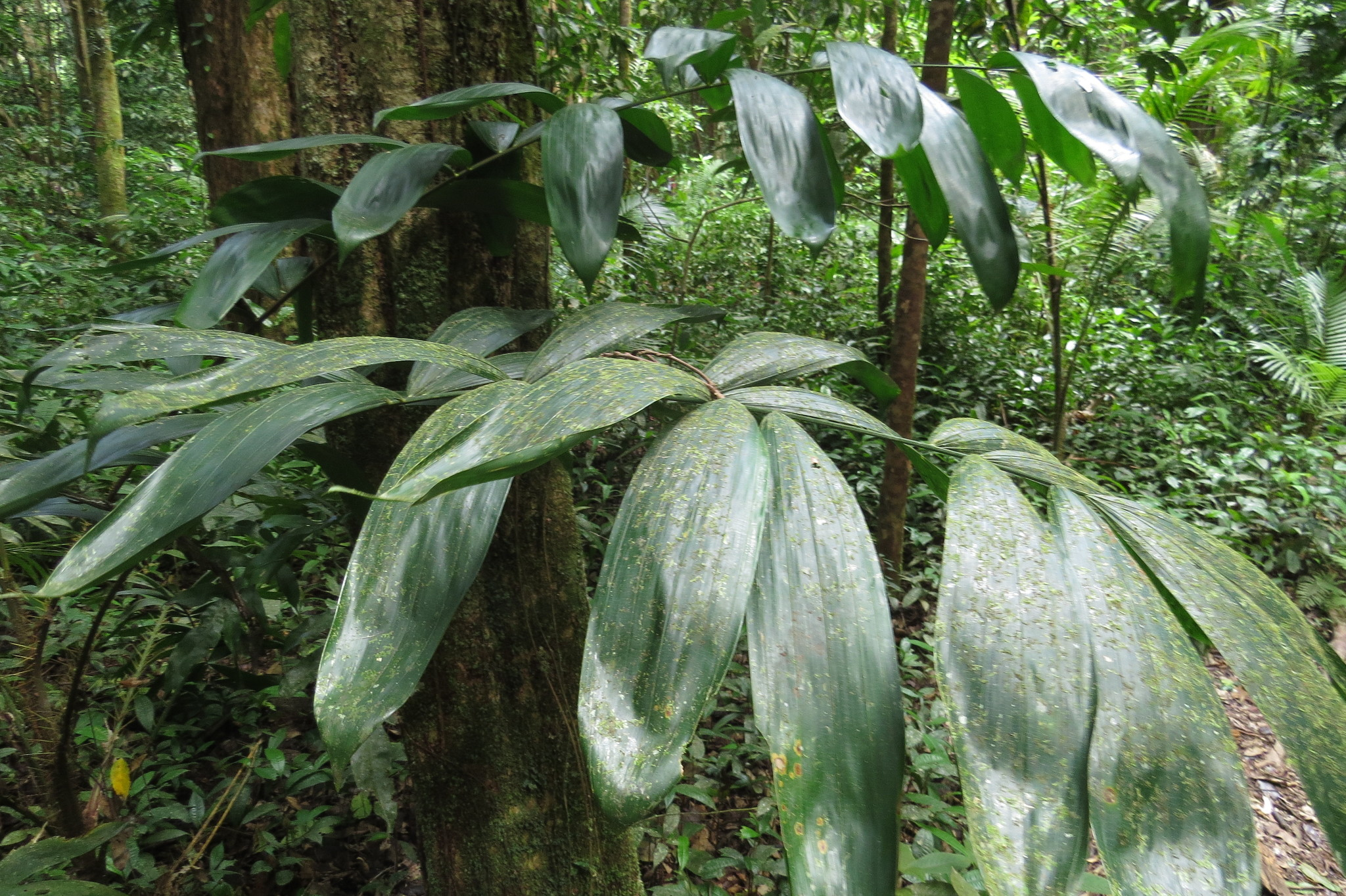

Conservation status
- Least Concern (NCA)

Scientific classification
- Kingdom: Plantae
- Clade: Tracheophytes
- Clade: Angiosperms
- Clade: Monocots
- Clade: Commelinids
- Order: Arecales
- Family: Arecaceae
- Genus: Calamus
- Species: C. vitiensis

Binomial name
- Calamus vitiensis Warb. ex Becc.
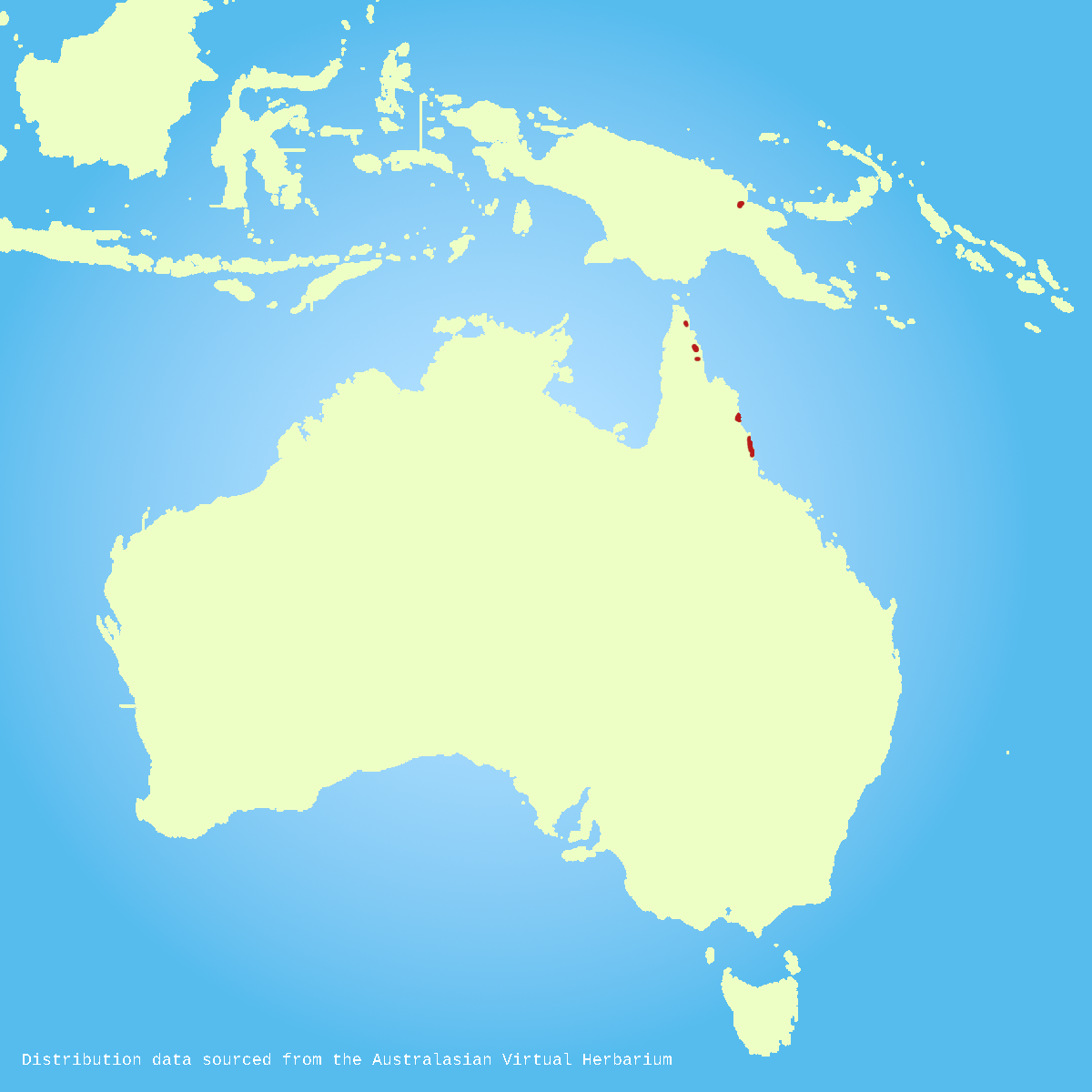
- Distribution of this species within Australia and New Guinea

Synonyms
- Calamus ledermannianus Becc.; Calamus pachypus W.J.Baker, Bayton, J.Dransf. & Maturb.; Calamus stipitatus Burret; Calamus vanuatuensis Dowe

= Calamus vitiensis =

Mission Beach wait-a-while

Species of flowering plant

Calamus vitiensis, commonly known as the Dunk Island lawyer vine, solitary lawyer vine or Mission Beach wait-a-while, is a climbing palm in the family Arecaceae. It is found from the Maluku Islands east through New Guinea and the Solomon Islands to Fiji and Vanuatu, and south to Queensland, Australia. It is a solitary (i.e. not clumping) palm with a stem diameter up to 3 cm (1.2 in). The leaves have 25–40 leaflets and the midrib extends into a barbed cirrus up to 150 cm (59 in) long. It grows in lowland rainforest up to about 150 m (490 ft). It was first described in 1908.

== Conservation ==
This species is listed by the Queensland Department of Environment and Science as least concern under its Nature Conservation Act legislation. As of 10 November 2022, it has not been assessed by the IUCN.

== Gallery ==
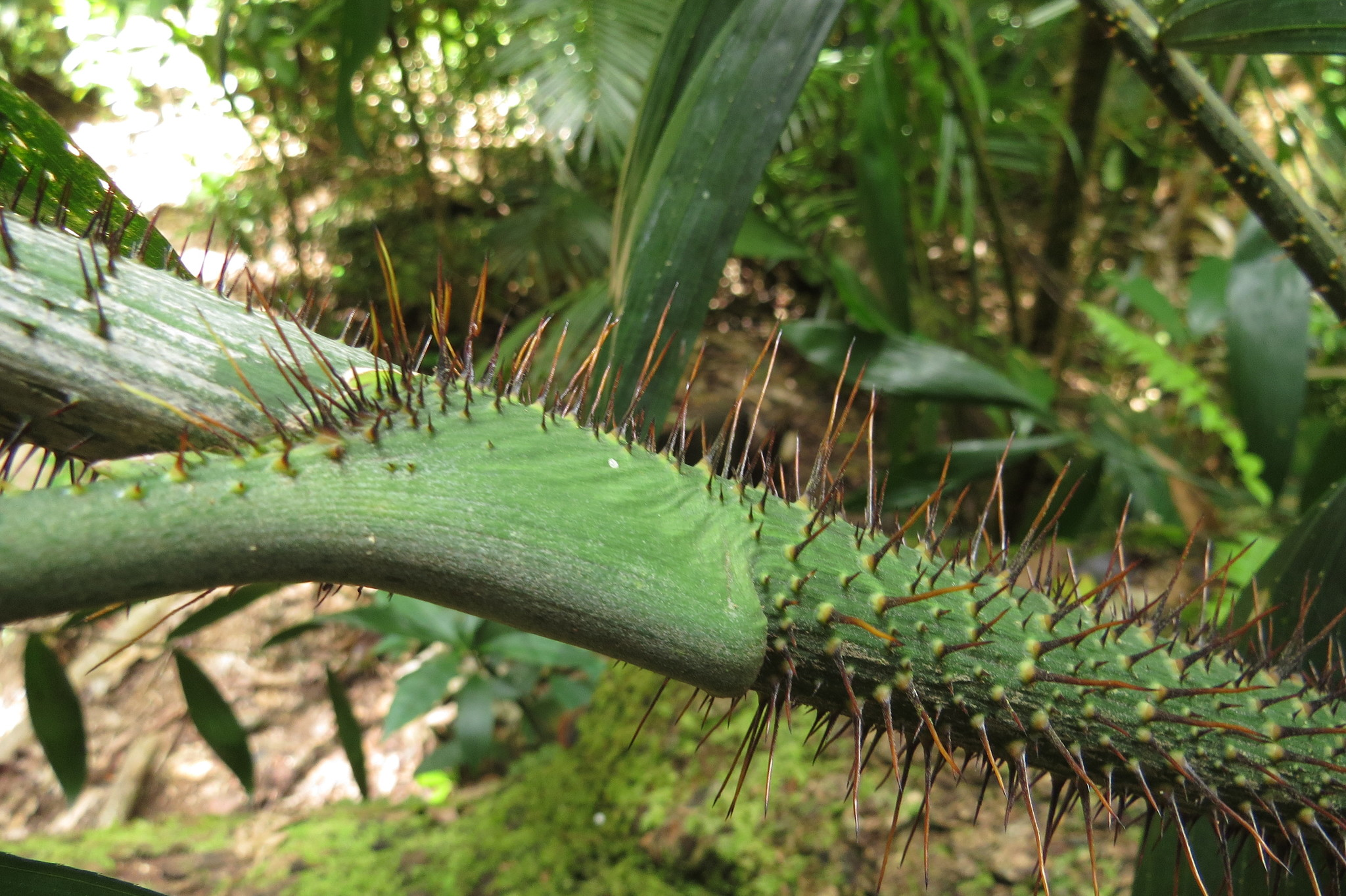
Spiny stem

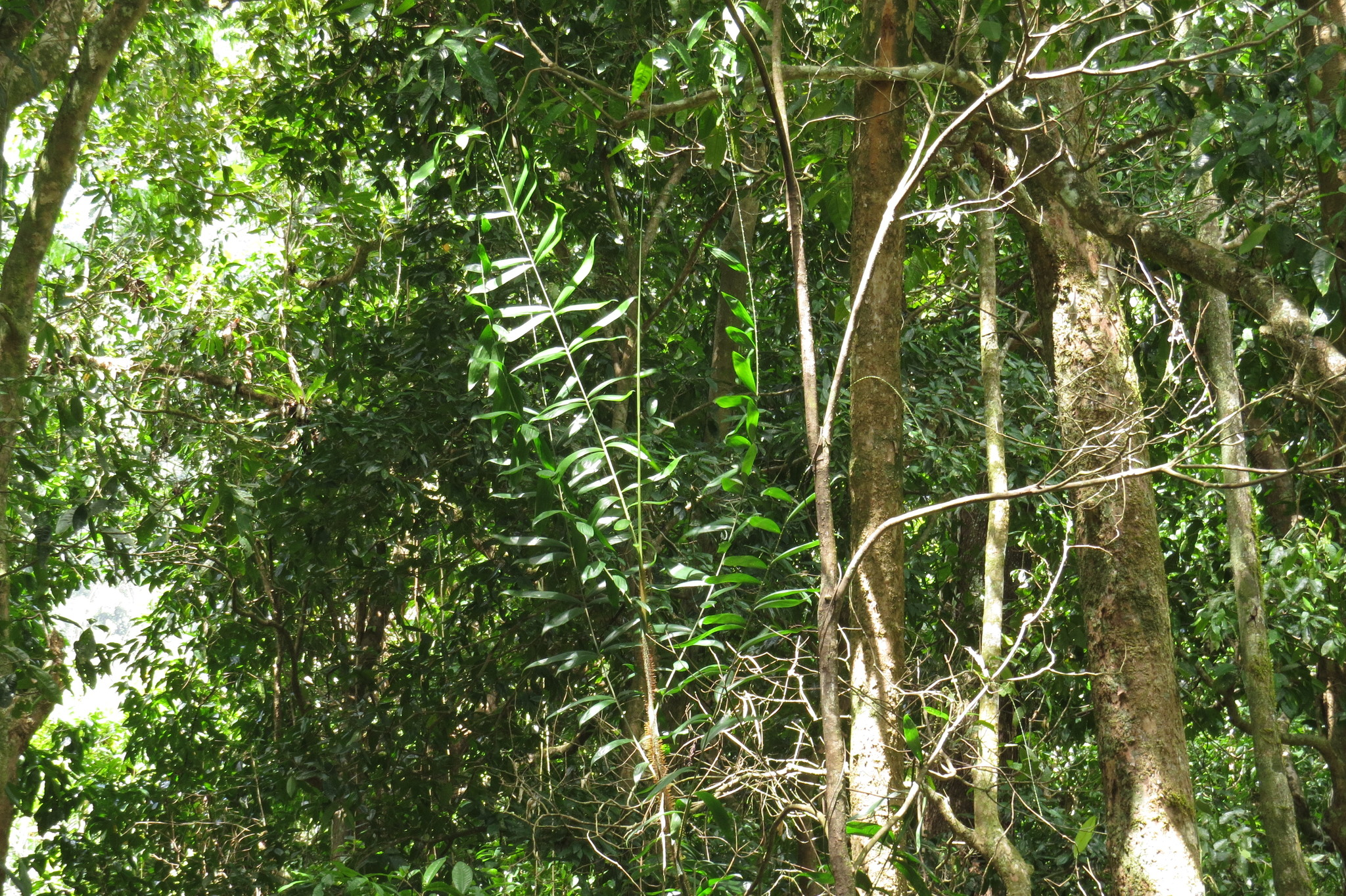
Habit

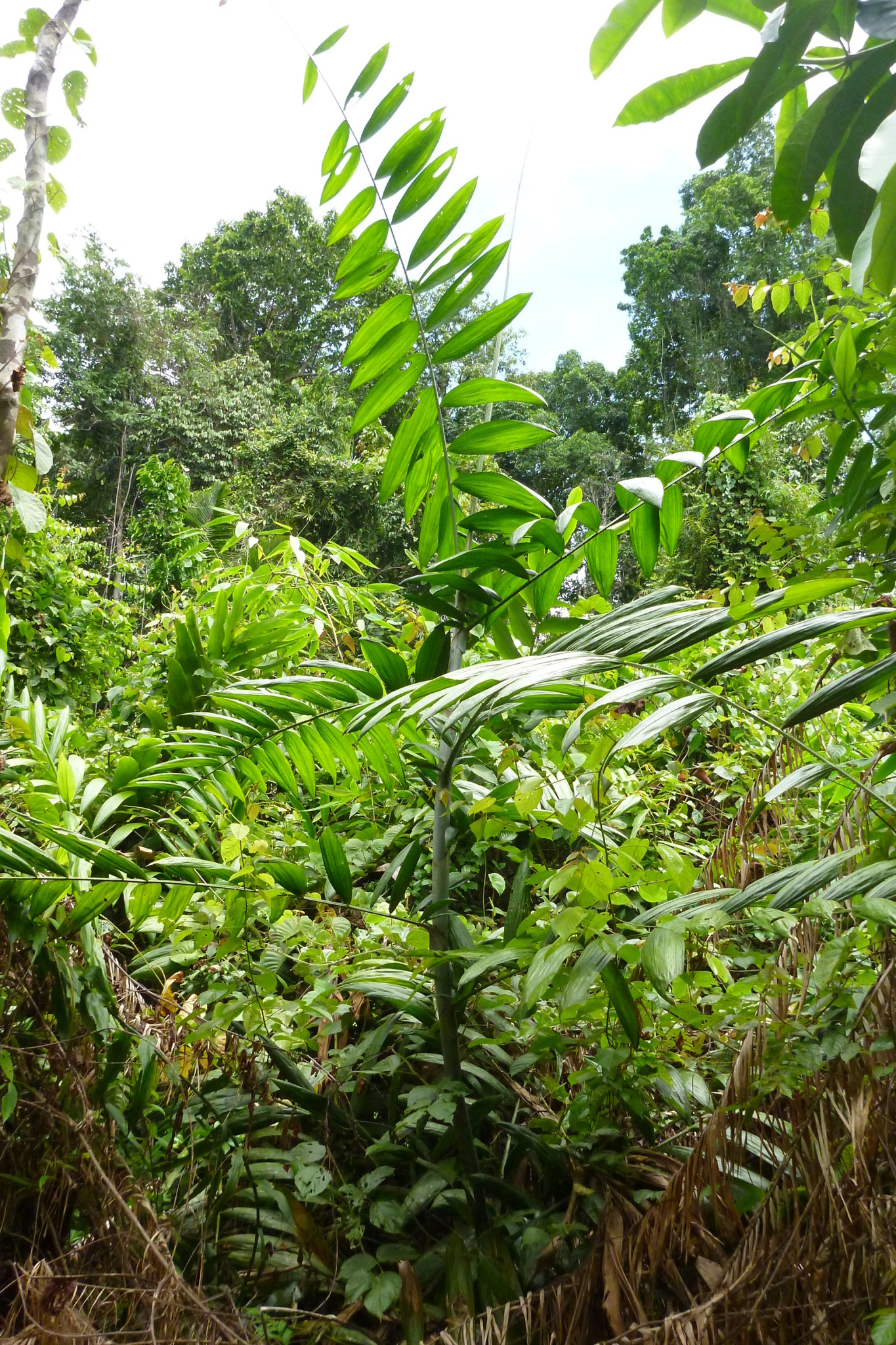
Habit
