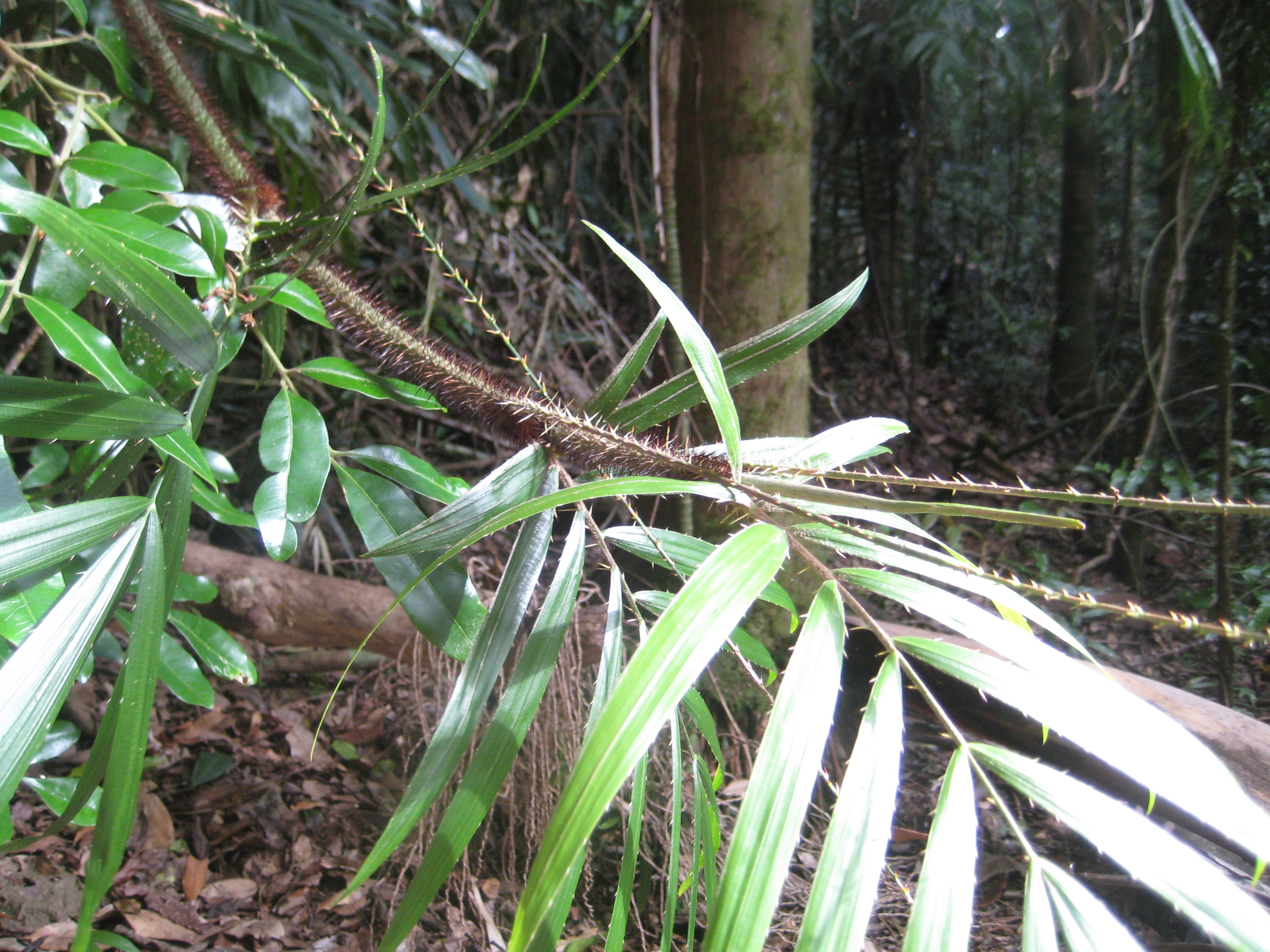
- In Nightcap National Park
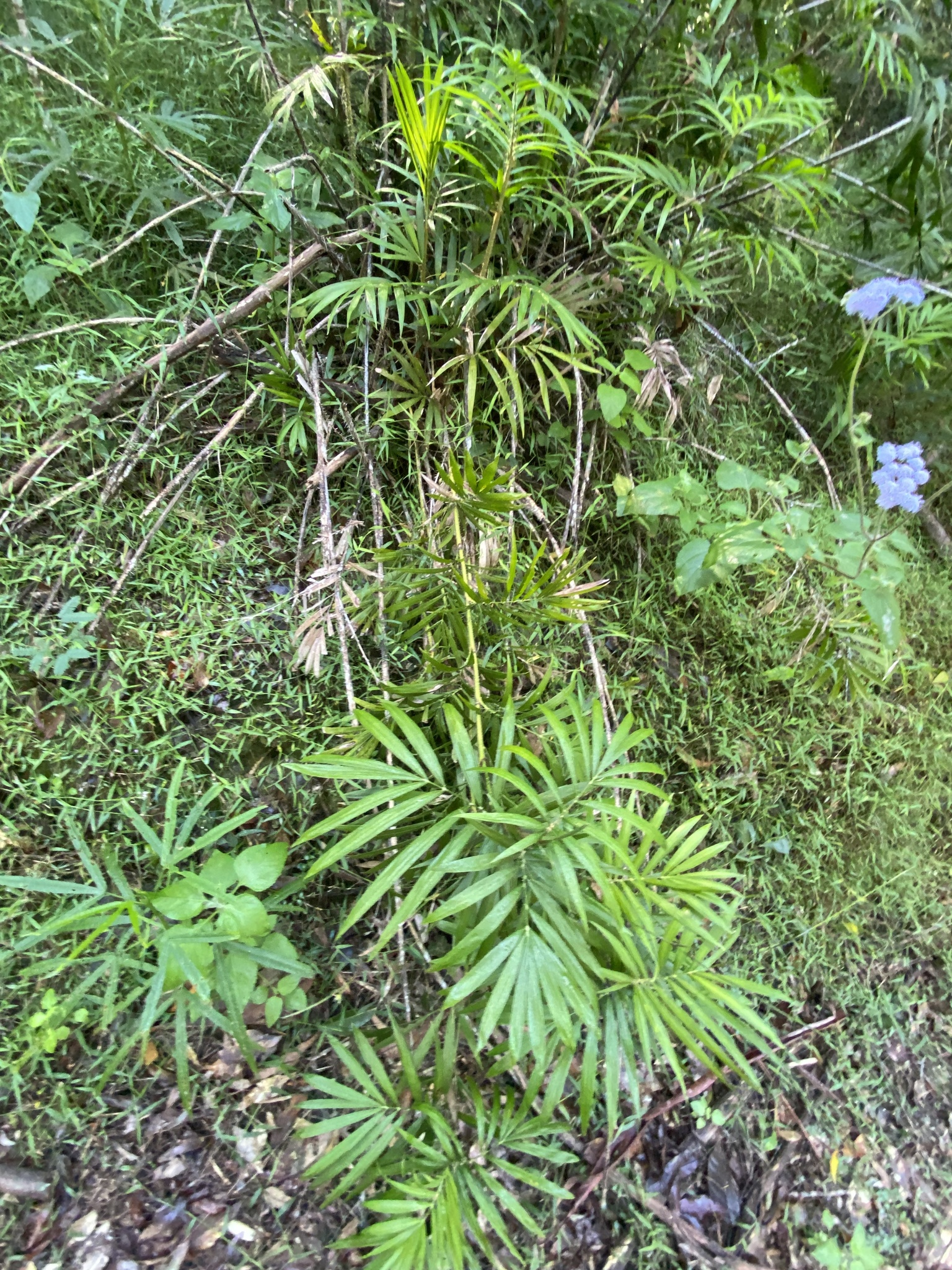
- Habit

Conservation status
- Least Concern (NCA)

Scientific classification
- Kingdom: Plantae
- Clade: Tracheophytes
- Clade: Angiosperms
- Clade: Monocots
- Clade: Commelinids
- Order: Arecales
- Family: Arecaceae
- Genus: Calamus
- Species: C. muelleri

Binomial name
- Calamus muelleri H.Wendl.

= Calamus muelleri =

Southern lawyer cane

Species of climbing palm native to Australia

Calamus muelleri, commonly known as southern lawyer cane or wait-a-while, is a climbing palm with a vine-like habit, endemic to the subtropical coastal rainforests of northern New South Wales and southern Queensland. Sharp hooks on the plant can snag the clothing of walkers in these forests, giving rise to the name "wait-a-while".

== Description ==
C. muelleri is a clustering, climbing palm growing up to 20 m (66 ft) in length, with thin stems up to 16 mm (0.63 in) diameter. The pinnate fronds are alternate and more or less sessile. They are up to 1 m (3 ft 3 in) long with 7-13 leaflets on each side and have long recurved spines on the rachis. The leaflets have spines along the midrib on the upper surface and small sharp spurs on their margins. The leaf sheath is densely covered in spines.

This species, like others in the genus, produces a modified sterile inflorescence (known as a flagellum) up to 1.2 m (3 ft 11 in) long, which is armed with dozens of strong, recurved barbs that act like grappling hooks to latch on to nearby vegetation and provide support for the plant.

Fertile inflorescences are up to 1 m (3 ft 3 in) long and flowering occurs in all months of the year. The fruits are a globose drupe about 12–16 mm (0.47–0.63 in) in diameter, containing a single seed.

== Taxonomy ==
The southern lawyer cane was first described by the German botanist and noted authority on Arecaceae Hermann Wendland, based on specimens collected by Hermann Beckler and others on the Brisbane River and Moreton Bay in Queensland and on the Clarence and Richmond Rivers in New South Wales. Wendland's work was published in the journal Linnaea; Ein Journal für die Botanik in ihrem ganzen Umfange in 1875.

== Distribution and habitat ==
Calamus muelleri grows in rainforests and wet sclerophyll forests in subtropical eastern Australia, from around Gympie in Queensland south to the Bellinger and Hastings Rivers in New South Wales.

== Ecology ==
Laetesia raveni, a species of spider endemic to eastern Australia, builds its web only in two plant species, Calamus muelleri and Solanum inaequilaterum, both of which are spiny plants.

== Conservation ==
This species is listed by the Queensland Department of Environment and Science as least concern. As of 4 December 2021, it has not been assessed by the IUCN.

== Uses ==
Aboriginal Australians used the cane stems for weaving.

== Gallery ==
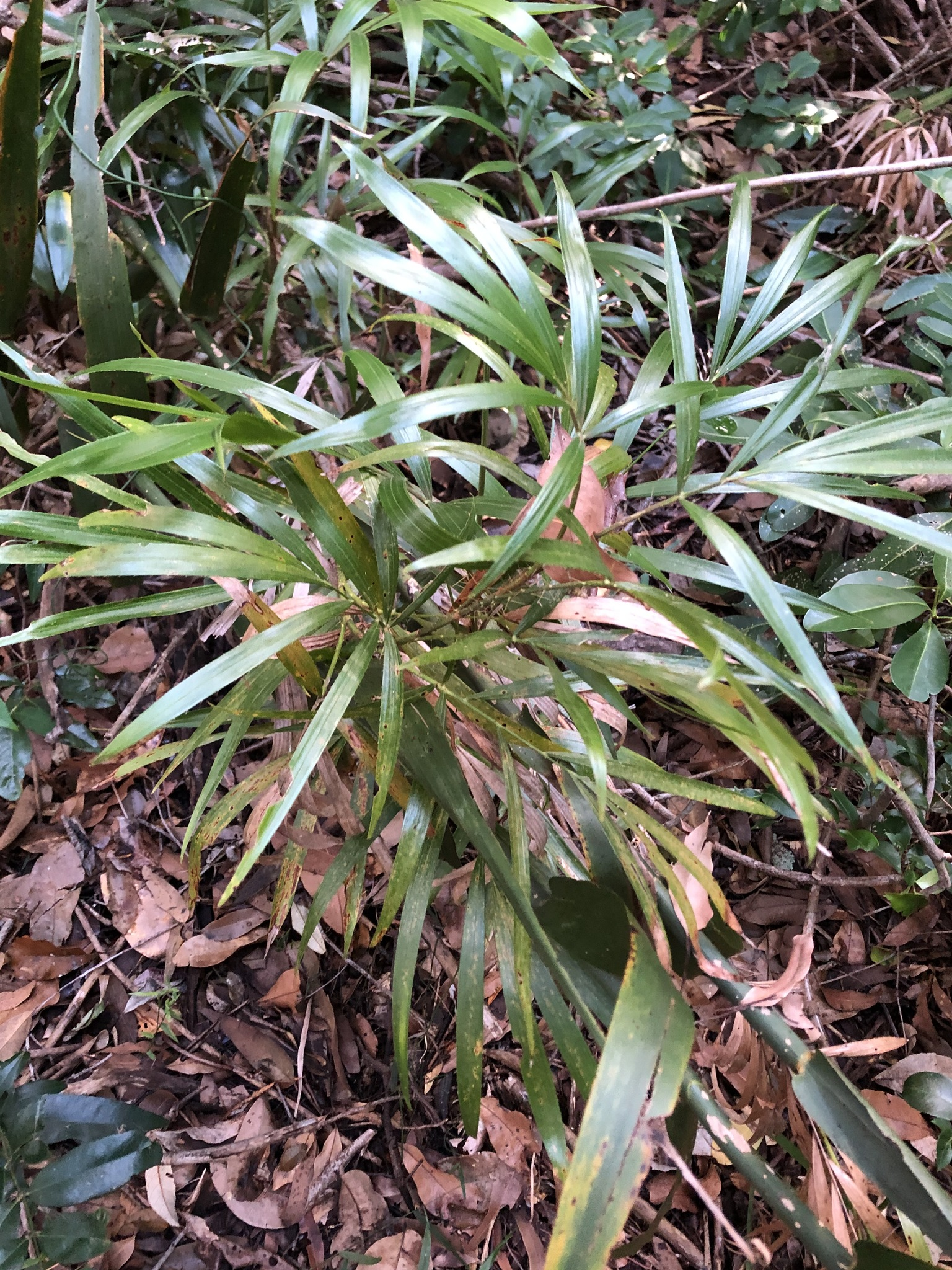
Young plant

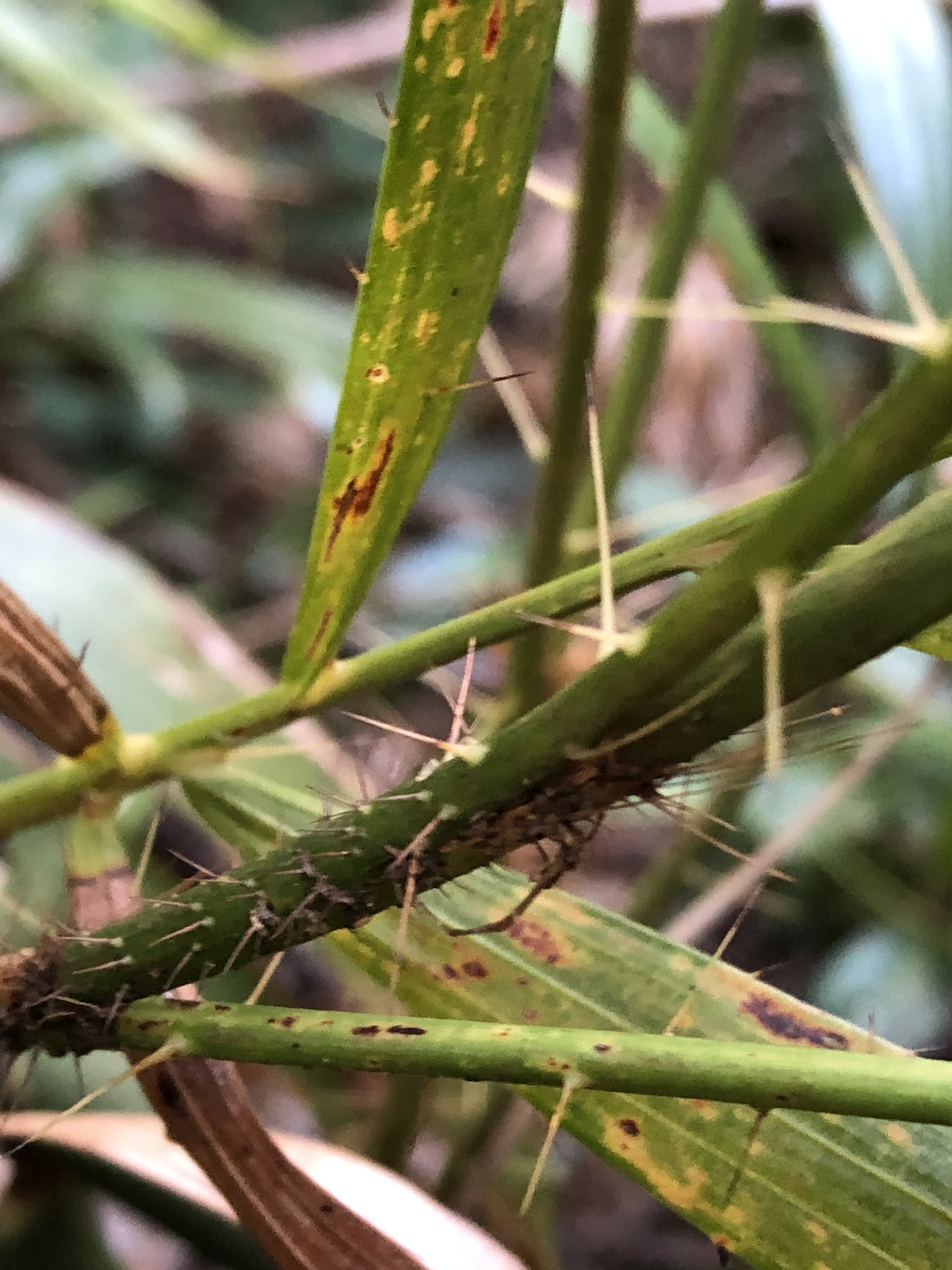
Spines

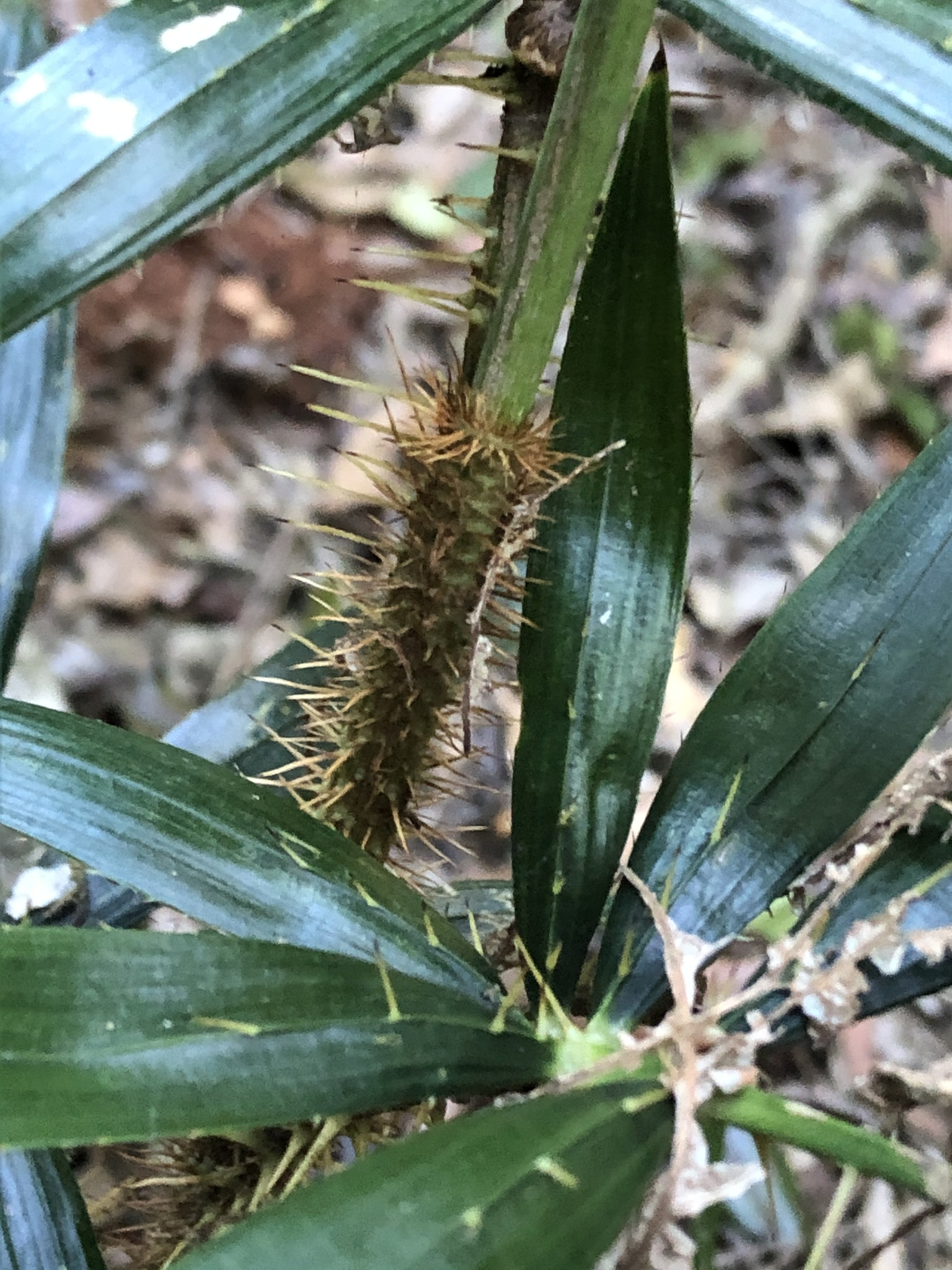
Stem

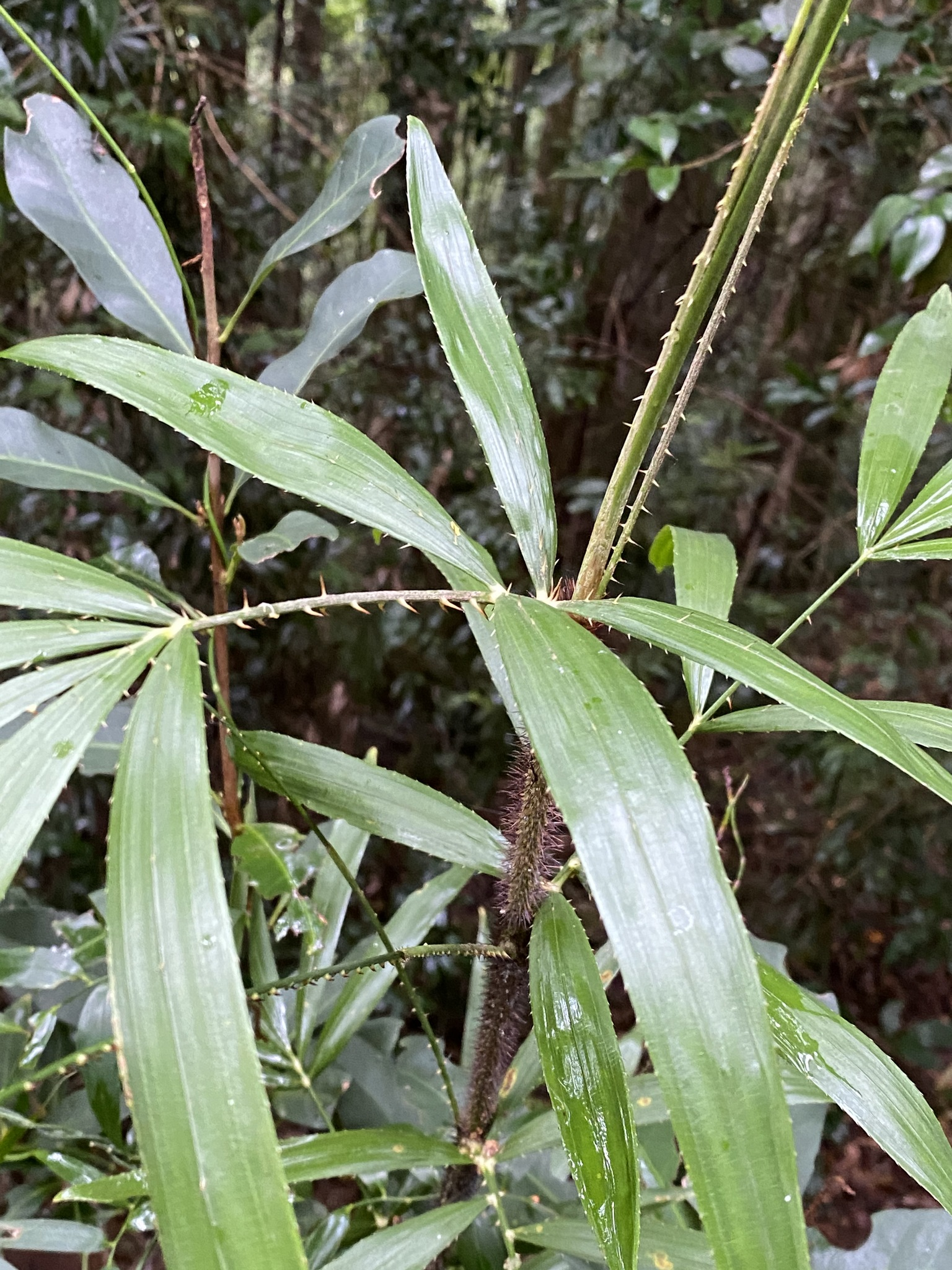
Leaf rachis

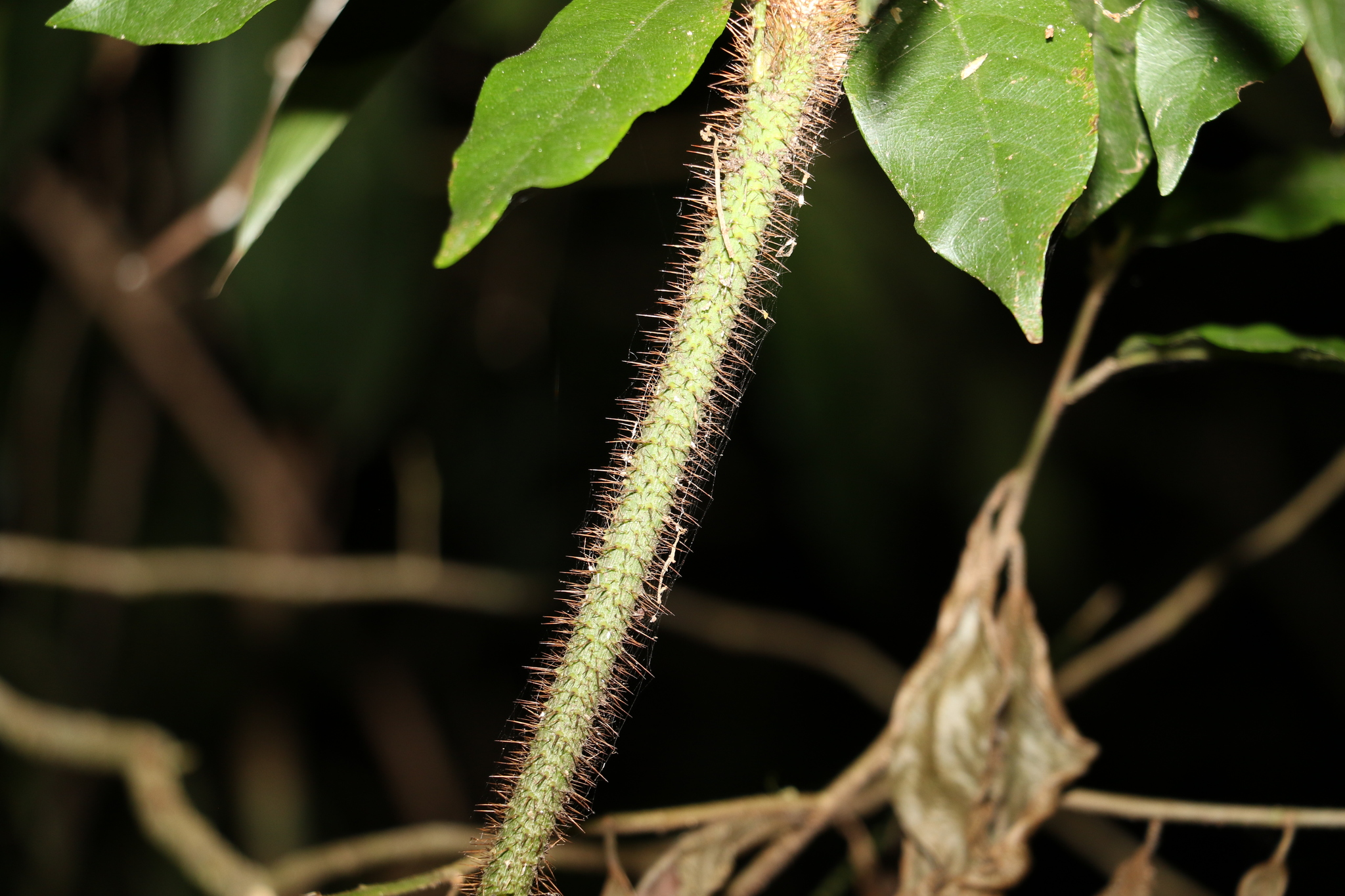
Stem
