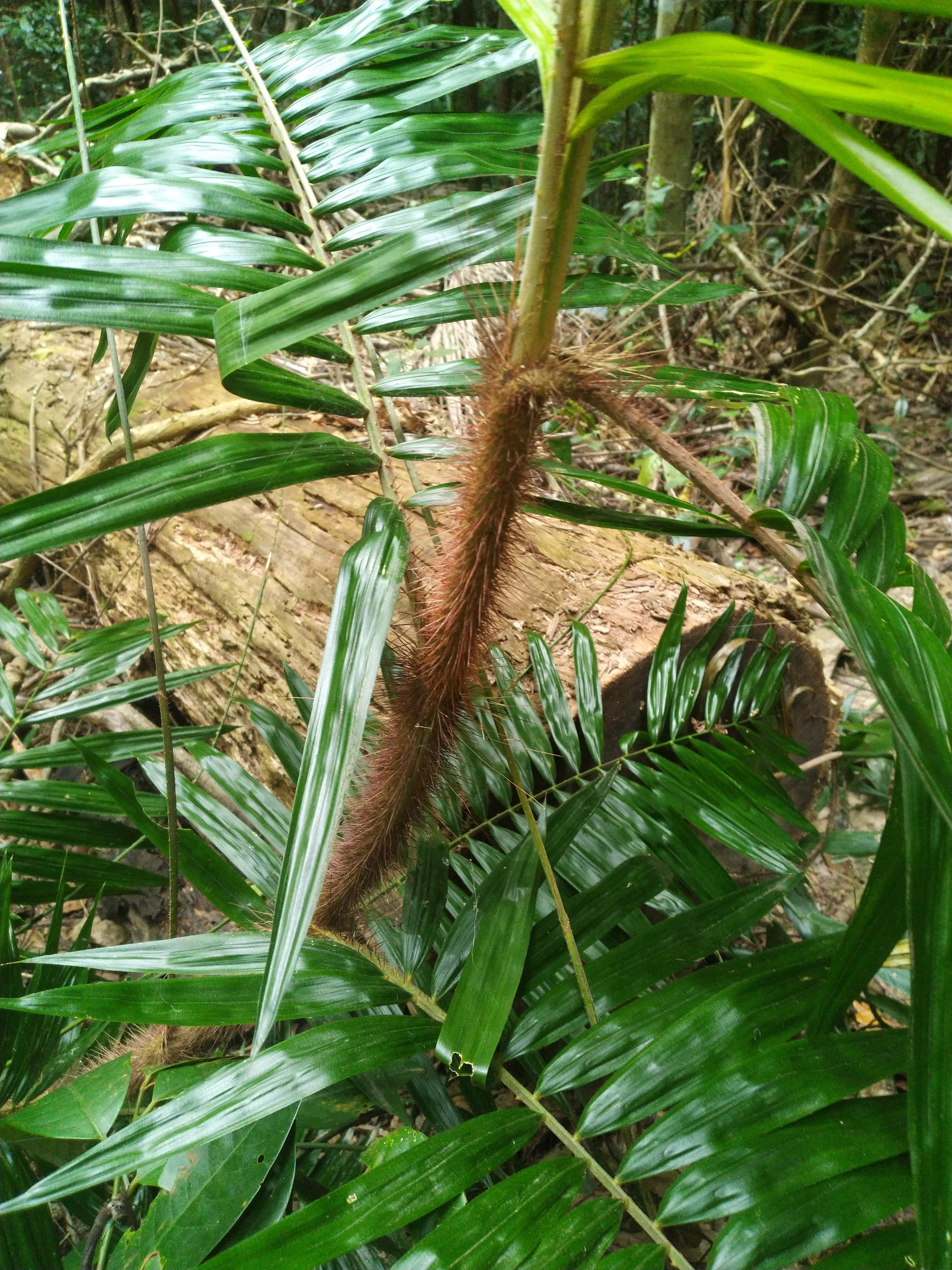
- Detail of stem with spines

Conservation status
- Least Concern (NCA)

Scientific classification
- Kingdom: Plantae
- Clade: Tracheophytes
- Clade: Angiosperms
- Clade: Monocots
- Clade: Commelinids
- Order: Arecales
- Family: Arecaceae
- Genus: Calamus
- Species: C. australis

Binomial name
- Calamus australis Mart.
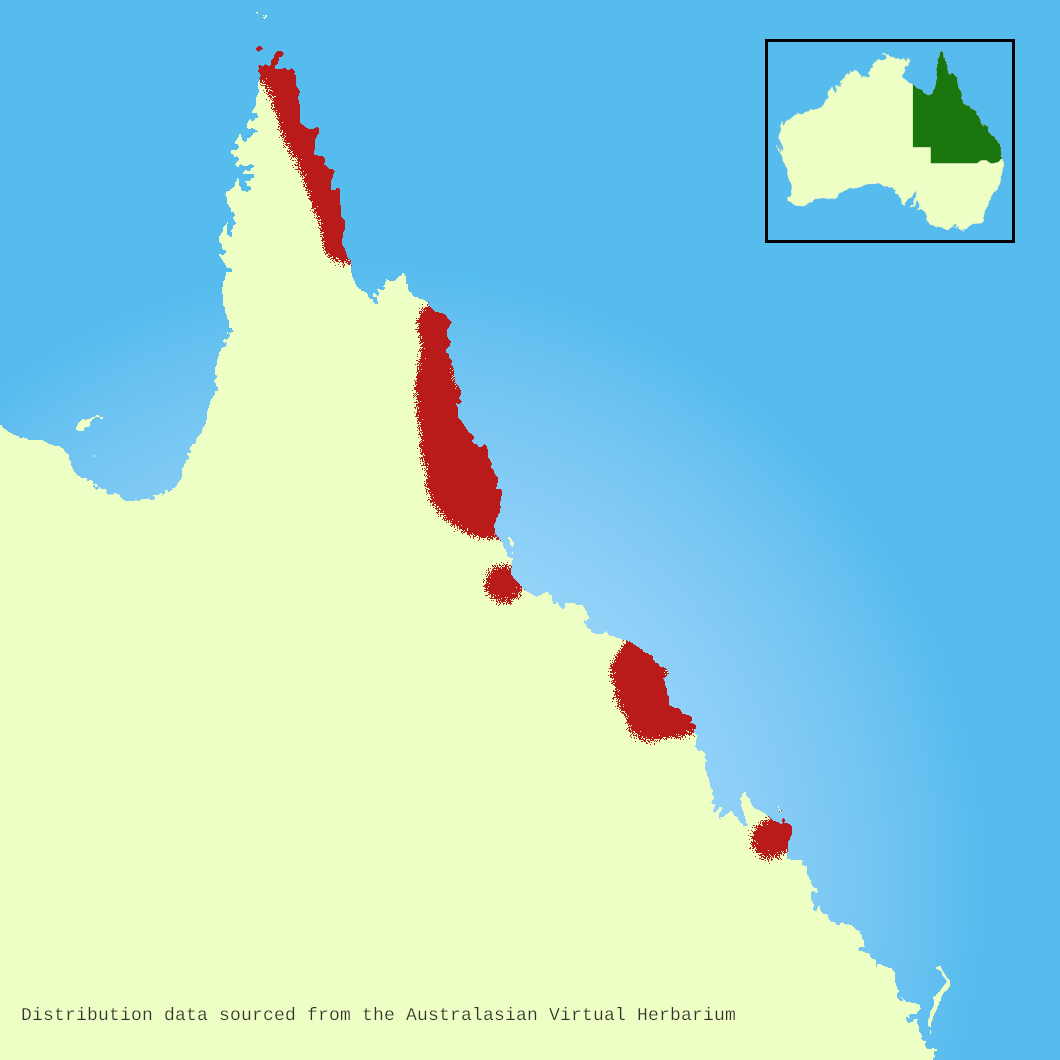

Synonyms
- Palmijuncus australis (Mart.) Kuntze; Calamus amischus Burret; Calamus jaboolum F.M.Bailey; Calamus obstruens F.Muell.

= Calamus australis =

Wait-a-while

Species of palm

Calamus australis, commonly known as wait-a-while, hairy mary or lawyer cane, is a plant in the palm family Arecaceae which is endemic to the rainforests of north east Queensland, Australia. Like other species in the genus Calamus, this is a climbing plant with a very long and flexible stem. It uses sharp strong hooks on the fronds and tendrils to attach itself to other vegetation, such as taller established trees, thus gaining support that enables it to grow higher towards the canopy. This species is very similar to C. radicalis, with which it coexists, but is smaller in almost all respects. Sharp hooks on the plant can snag the clothing of walkers, giving rise to the name "wait-a-while".

== Description ==
Stems may reach lengths of up to 35 m (110 ft) and a diameter of 2 cm (0.8 in). The leaves (or fronds) are produced on the youngest part of the stem, and the older sections are bare as the leaves age and fall off (the same process as the more familiar upright palm with a stout stem). The older, leafless part of the stem of Calamus australis is smooth and glossy green.

The leaves have a long leaf sheath clasping the stem, which is densely covered with needle-like spines measuring up to 10 cm (3.9 in) long, but usually less. Tendrils, measuring several metres in length and armed with many stout, recurved barbs are produced from the leaf sheath. The leaf itself is pinnate, up to 1.5 m (5 ft) in length, and has around 20 to 25 pairs of leaflets. Leaves are armed with stout recurved barbs on the lower surfaces of the rachis. Unlike its very similar sister species C. radicalis, it does not have spines on the leaflets themselves. The overall outline of the leaf is elliptic and the longest leaflets are at the midpoint of the frond, measuring about 30 cm (12 in) long by 3 cm (1.2 in) wide.

The inflorescences are pendulous panicles measuring up to 2 m (6.6 ft) in length, carrying either staminate (functionally male) or pistillate (functionally female) flowers.

Fruits are a white or cream drupe, around 8 to 14 mm (0.3 to 0.6 in) diameter, with a scaly exterior. They contain a single spherical seed which is surrounded by a thin layer of soft edible flesh.

== Taxonomy ==
Calamus australis was first described 1838 by the German botanist Carl Friedrich Philipp von Martius in volume 3 of his highly regarded work Historia naturalis palmarum.

== Distribution and habitat ==
This is the most widespread of the eight Australian species of Calamus. It is endemic to tropical areas of Queensland, from the tip of Cape York Peninsula south to near Rockhampton on the Tropic of Capricorn, and from sea level to about 1,600 m (5,250 ft). It grows in gallery forest and well developed rainforest.

== Ecology ==
Fruits of this species are eaten by fruit doves (genus Ptilinopus) and southern cassowaries (Casuarius casuarius).

== Conservation ==
This species is listed by Queensland's Department of the Environment, Tourism, Science and Innovation as least concern. As of 10 December 2022, it has not been assessed by the IUCN.

== Uses ==
Indigenous Australians had many uses for this plant and its sister species. The young shoots were eaten, along with the fruits. The long flexible stem was used to make shelters, axe handles, fish traps, snares, and waist straps for climbing trees, and the thorny tendrils were used to catch fish.

== Gallery ==
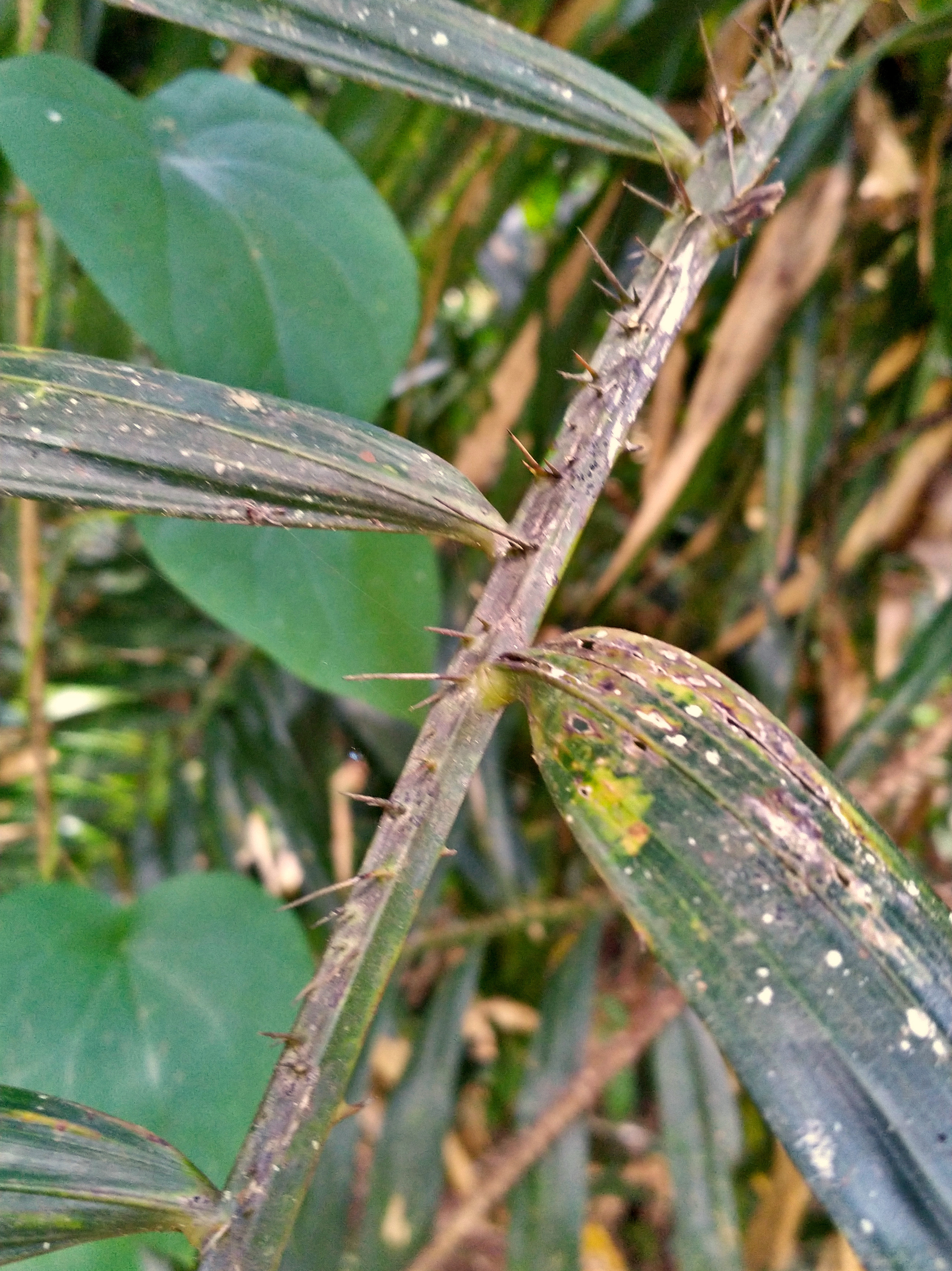
Rachis with spines

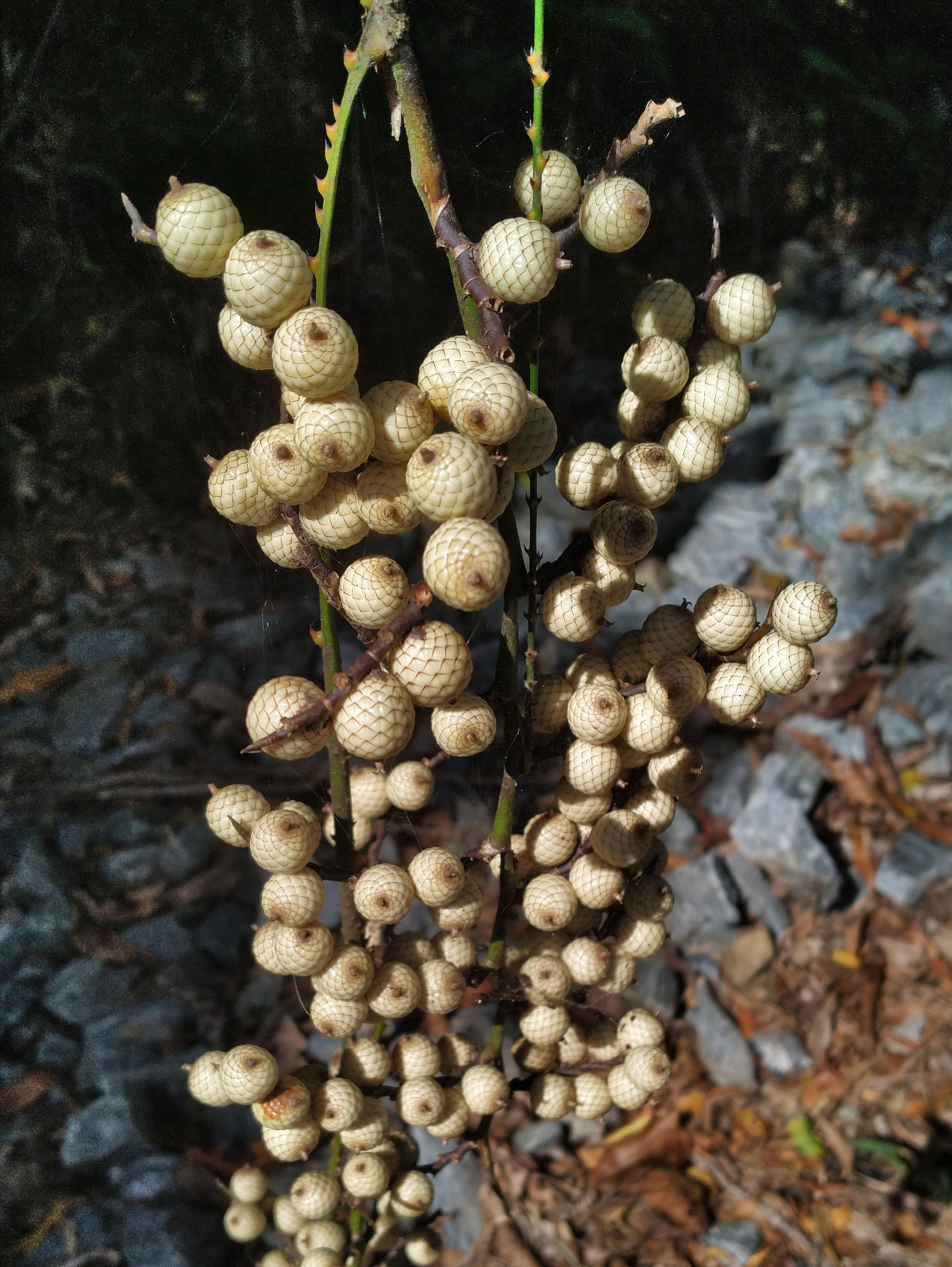
Fruit

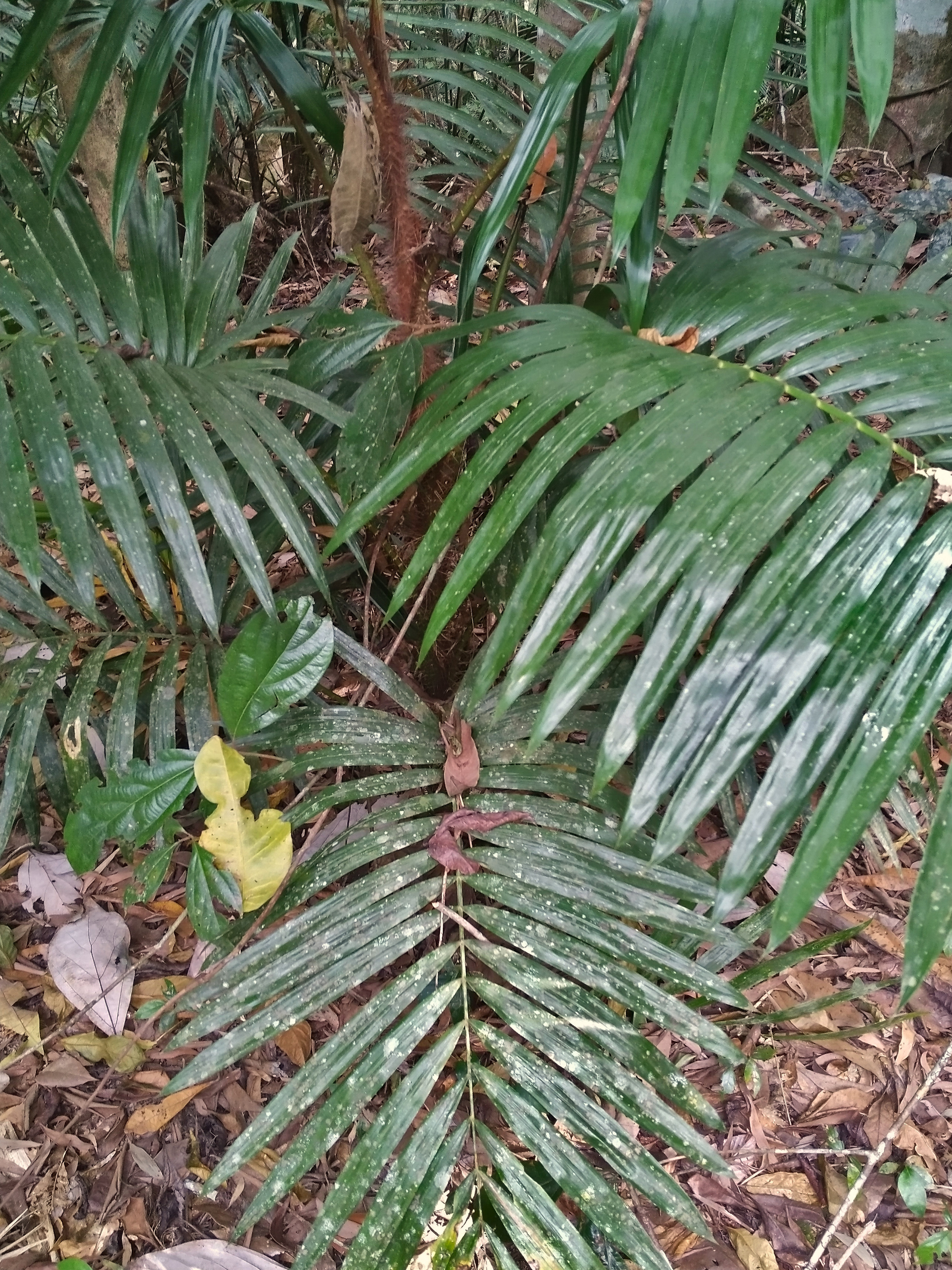
Foliage and stem

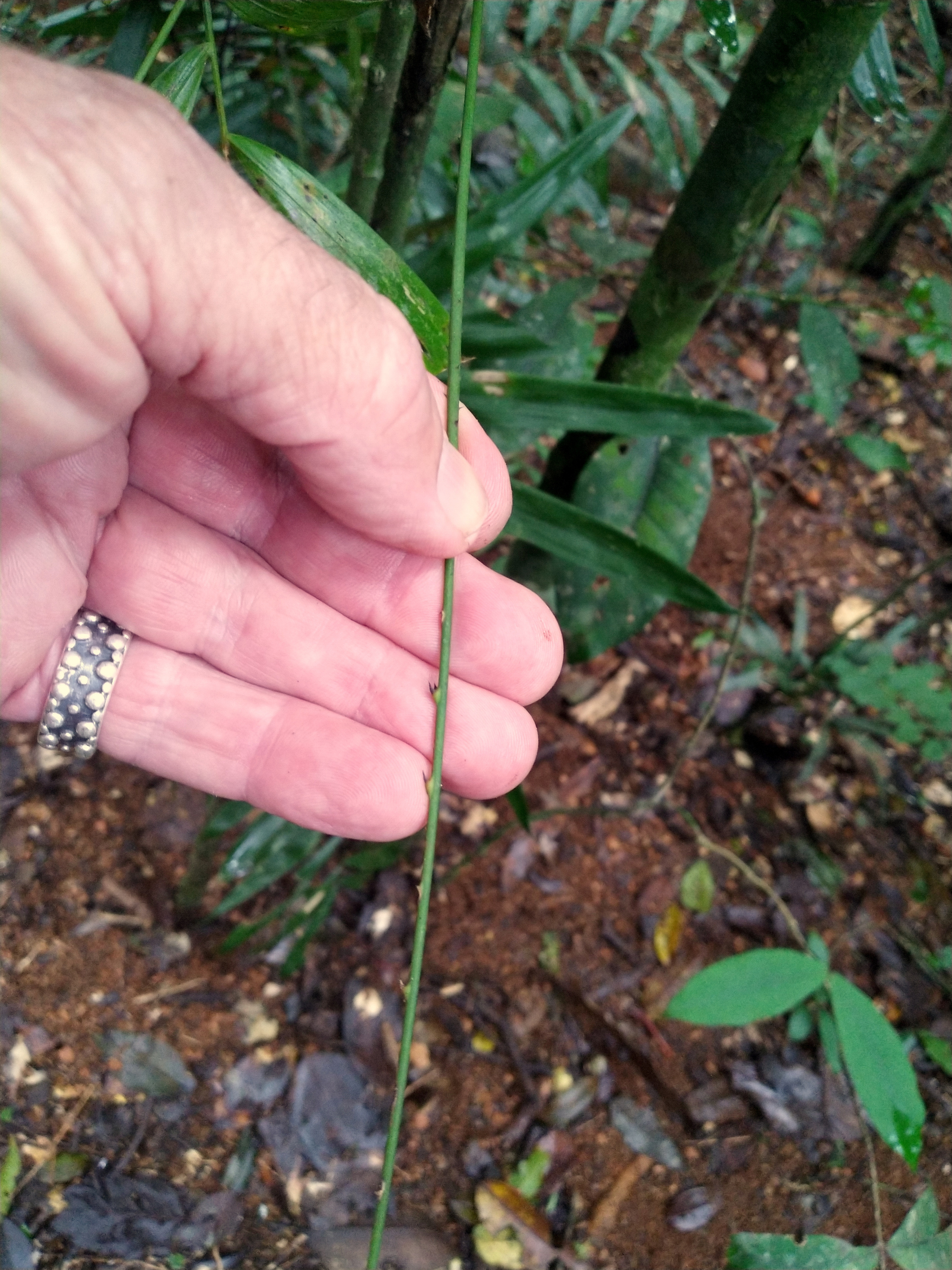
Tendril

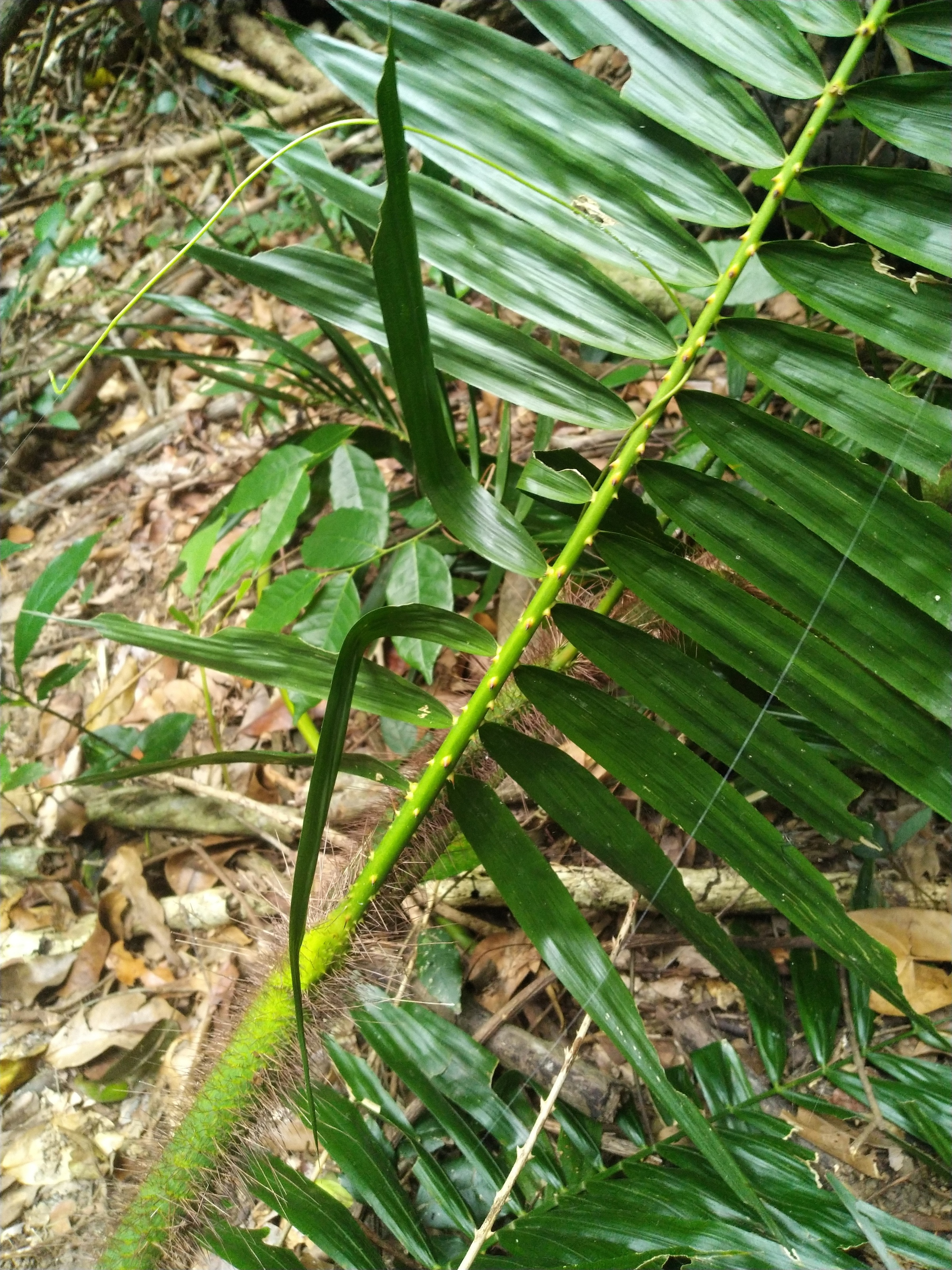
Underside of leaf, showing barbs on rachis
