= Rattan =

Material (vegetable source)

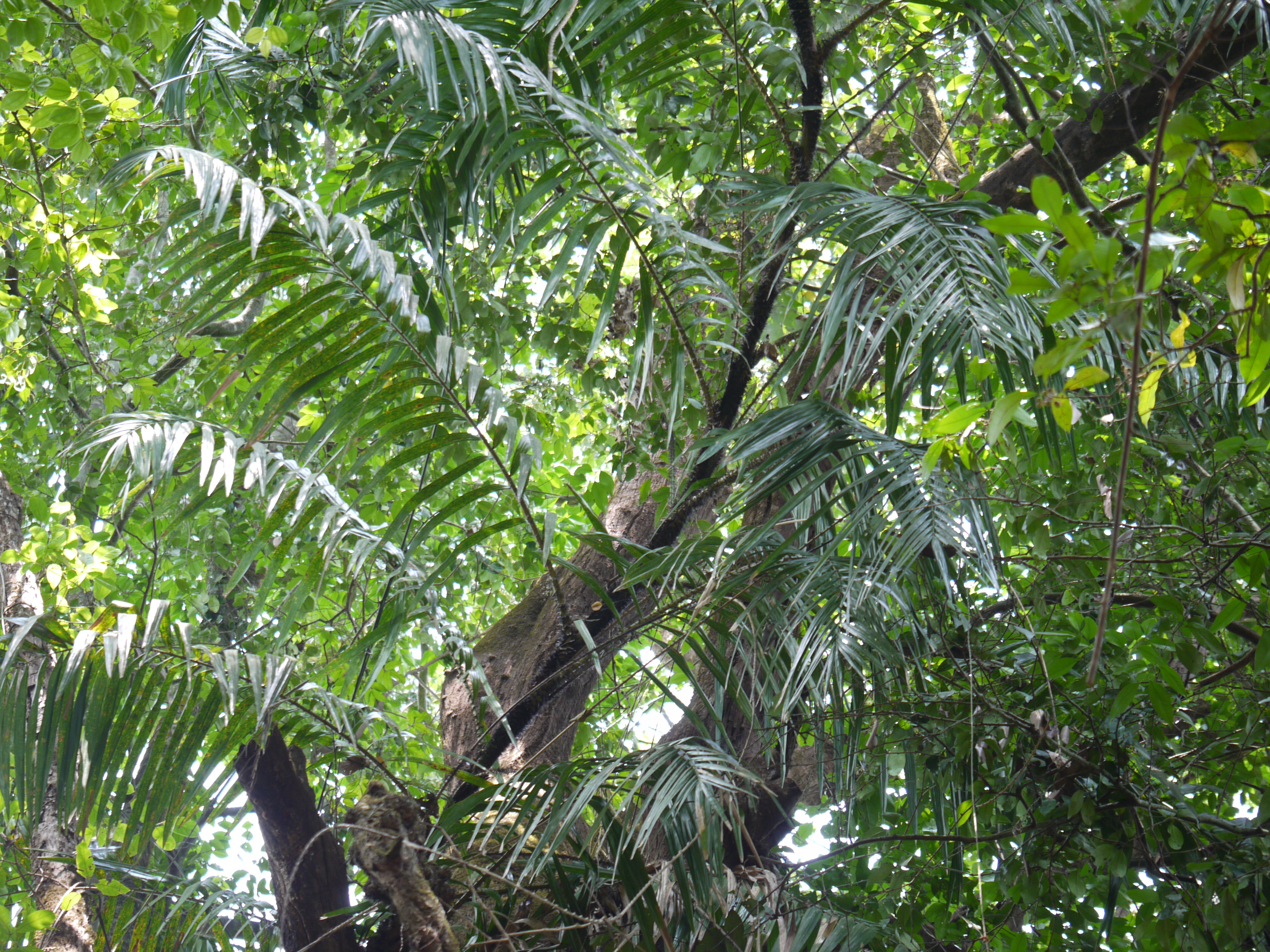
Calamus thwaitesii in southwestern India

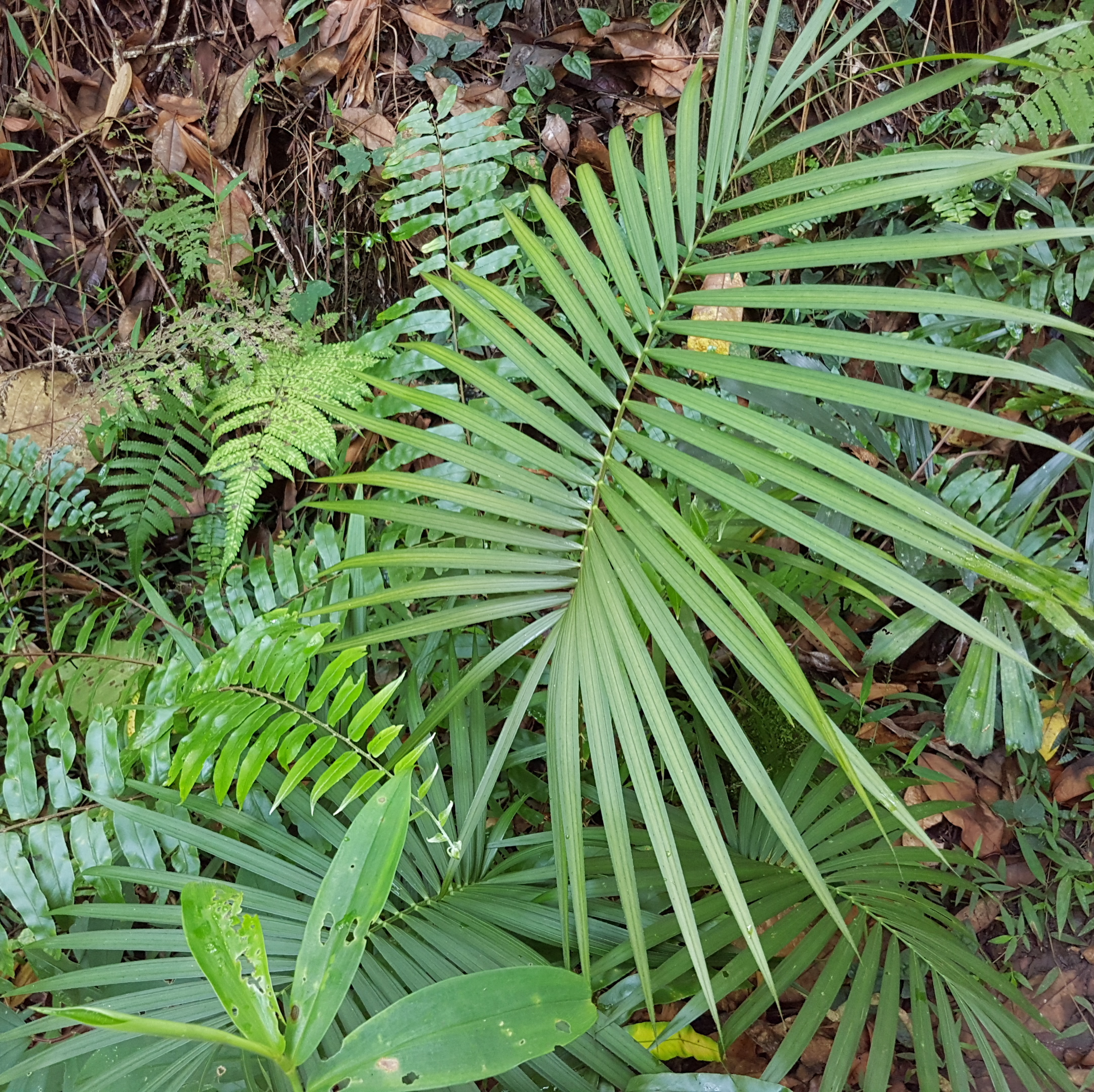
Juvenile Calamus oblongus subsp. mollis in a forest understory in the Philippines

Rattan, also spelled ratan (from Malay: rotan), is the name for roughly 600 species of Old World climbing palms belonging to subfamily Calamoideae. The greatest diversity of rattan palm species and genera are in the closed-canopy old-growth tropical forests of Southeast Asia, though they can also be found in other parts of tropical Asia and Africa. Most rattan palms are ecologically considered lianas due to their climbing habits, unlike other palm species. A few species also have tree-like or shrub-like habits.

Around 20% of rattan palm species are economically important and are traditionally used in Southeast Asia in producing wickerwork furniture, baskets, canes, woven mats, cordage, and other handicrafts. Rattan canes are one of the world's most valuable non-timber forest products. Some species of rattan also have edible scaly fruit and heart of palm. Despite increasing attempts in the last 30 years at commercial cultivation, almost all rattan products still come from wild-harvested plants. Rattan supplies are now rapidly threatened due to deforestation and overexploitation. Rattan were also historically known as Manila cane or Malacca cane, based on their trade origins, as well as numerous other trade names for individual species.

== Description ==
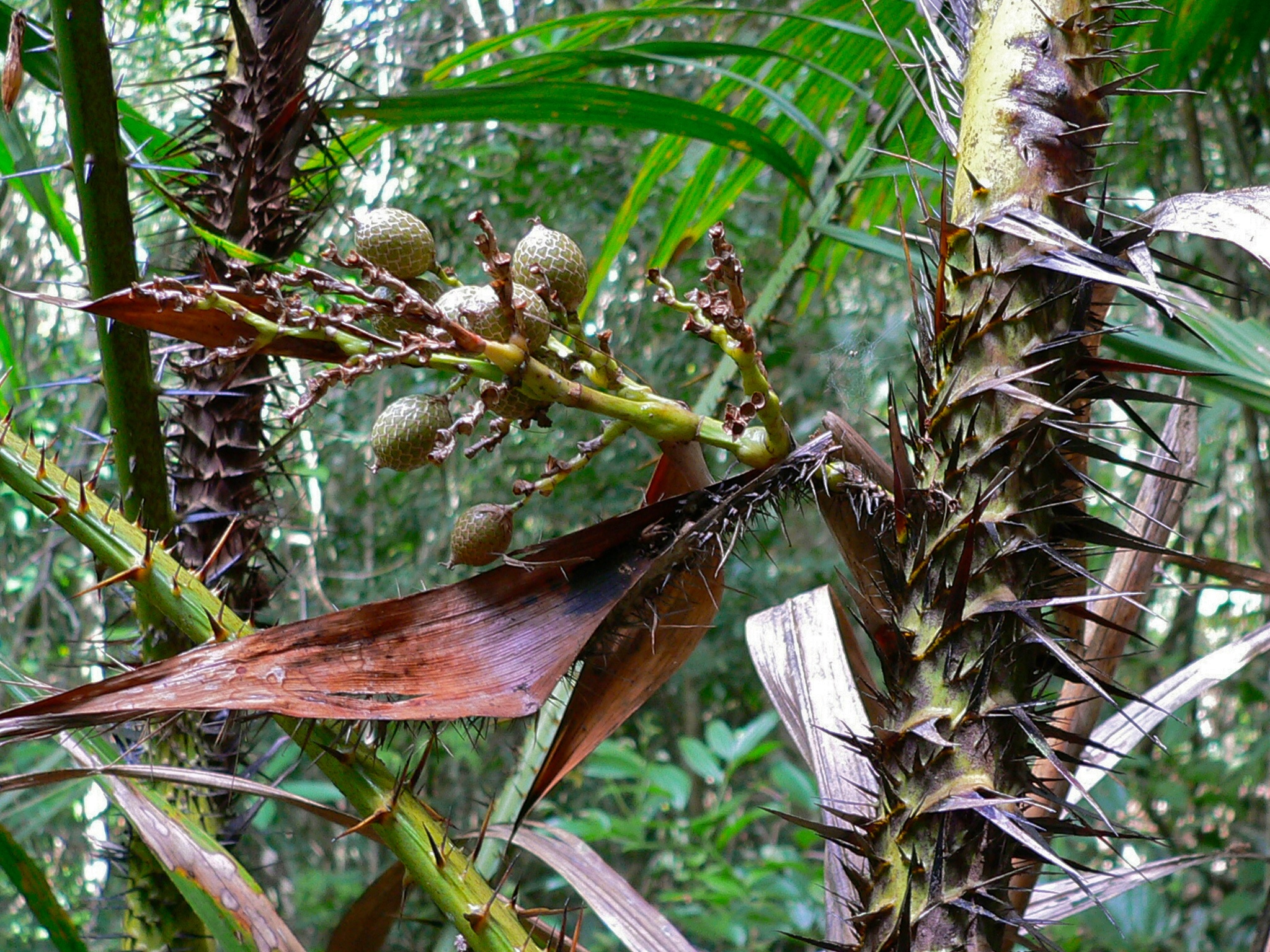
Close-up of the edible scaly fruits and the spiny stem of Calamus rotang in Thailand

Most rattan palms are classified ecologically as lianas because most mature rattan palms have a vine-like habit, scrambling through and over other vegetation. However, they are different from true woody lianas in several ways. Because rattans are palms, they do not branch and they rarely develop new root structures upon contact of the stem with soil. They are monocots, and thus, do not exhibit secondary growth. This means the diameter of the rattan stem is always constant: juvenile rattan palms have the same width as when adult, usually around 2–5 centimetres (3/4–2 inches) in diameter, with long internodes between the leaves. This also means juvenile rattan palms are rigid enough to remain free-standing, unlike true lianas which always need structural support, even when young. Many rattans also have spines which act as hooks to aid climbing over other plants, and to deter herbivores. The spines also give rattans the ability to climb wide-diameter trees, unlike other vines which use tendrils or twining which can only climb narrower supports. Rattans have been known to grow up to hundreds of metres long.

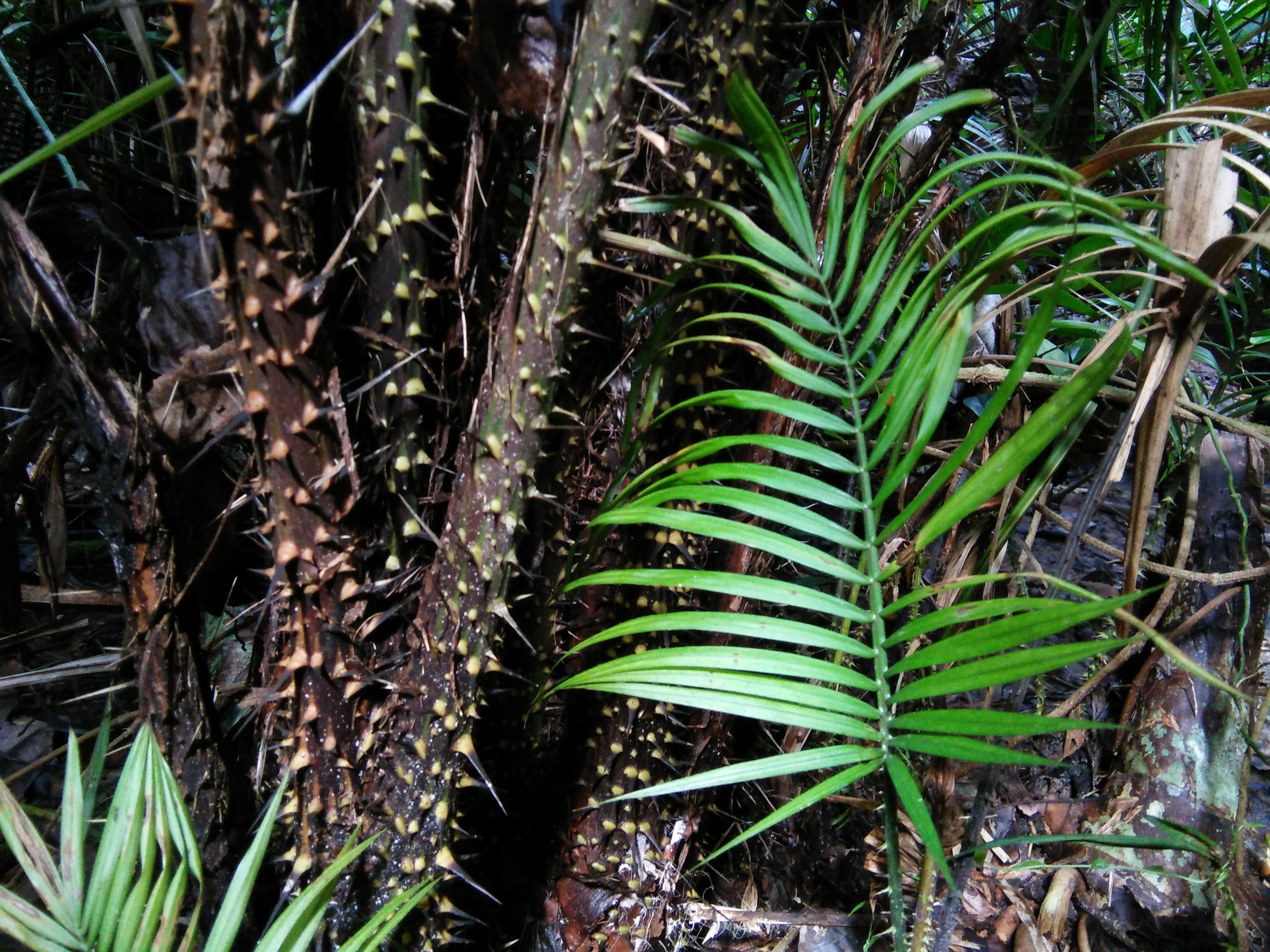
Base of a clustering rattan palm in Sulawesi, Indonesia

A few species of rattans are non-climbing. These range from free-standing tree-like species (like Calamus dumetosa) to acaulescent shrub-like species with short subterranean stems (like Calamus pygmaeus).

Rattans can also be solitary (single-stemmed), clustering (clump-forming), or both. Solitary rattan species grow into a single stem. Clustering rattan, on the other hand, develop clumps of up to 50 stems via suckers, similar to bamboo and bananas. These clusters can produce new stems continually as individual stems die. The impact of harvesting is much greater in solitary species, since the whole plant dies when harvested. An example of a commercially important single-stemmed species is Calamus manan. Clustering species, on the other hand, have more potential to become sustainable if the rate of harvesting does not exceed the rate of stem replacement via vegetative reproduction.

Rattans display two types of flowering: hapaxanthy and pleonanthy. All the species of the genera Korthalsia, Laccosperma, Plectocomia, Plectocomiopsis, and Myrialepis are hapaxanthic; as well as a few species of Calamus. This means they only flower and fruit once then die. All other rattan species are pleonanthic, being able to flower and fruit continually. Most commercially harvested species are pleonanthic, because hapaxanthic rattans tend to have soft piths making them unsuitable for bending.

== Taxonomy ==
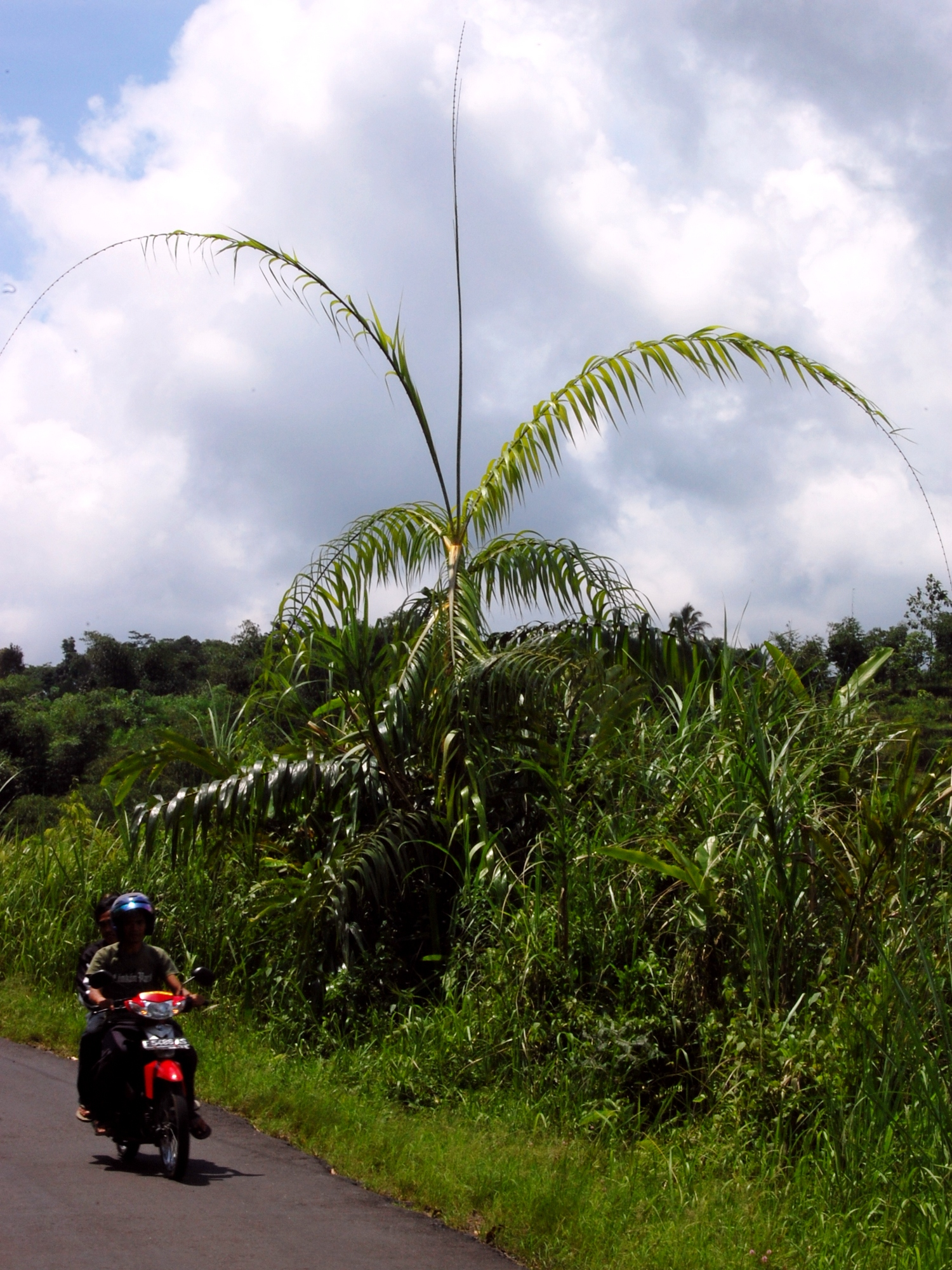
Free-standing juvenile Plectocomia elongata in Indonesia

Calamoideae includes tree palms such as Raffia (raphia) and Metroxylon (sago palm) and shrub palms such as Salacca (salak) (Uhl & Dransfield 1987 Genera Palmarum). The climbing habit in palms is not restricted to Calamoideae, but has also evolved in three other evolutionary lines—tribes Cocoseae (Desmoncus with c. 7–10 species in the New World tropics) and Areceae (Dypsis scandens in Madagascar) in subfamily Arecoideae, and tribe Hyophorbeae (climbing species of the large genus Chamaedorea in Central America) in subfamily Ceroxyloideae. They do not have spinose stems and climb by means of their reflexed terminal leaflets. Of these only Desmoncus spp. furnish stems of sufficiently good quality to be used as rattan cane substitutes.

There are 13 different genera of rattans that include around 600 species. Some of the species in these "rattan genera" have a different habit and do not climb, they are shrubby palms of the forest undergrowth; nevertheless they are close relatives to species that are climbers and they are hence included in the same genera. The largest rattan genus is Calamus, distributed in Asia except for one species represented in Africa. From the remaining rattan genera, Korthalsia, Plectocomia, Plectocomiopsis, and Myrialepis are centered in Southeast Asia with outliers eastwards and northwards; and three are endemic to Africa: Laccosperma (syn. Ancistrophyllum), Eremospatha and Oncocalamus.

The rattan genera and their distribution (Uhl & Dransfield 1987 Genera Palmarum, Dransfield 1992):

Genus	Number of species	Distribution
Calamus L.	c. 480	Tropical Africa, India and Sri Lanka, China, south and east to Fiji, Vanuatu and eastern Australia (synonyms including Daemonorops)
Calospatha Becc.	–	Synonym of Calamus
Ceratolobus Bl.	–	Synonym of Calamus
Eremospatha (Mann & Wendl.) Wendl.	10	Humid tropical Africa
Korthalsia Bl.	c. 26	Indo-China and Burma to New Guinea
Laccosperma (Mann & Wendl.) Drude	5	Humid tropical Africa
Myrialepis Becc.	1	Indo-China, Thailand, Burma, Peninsular Malaysia and Sumatra
Oncocalamus (Wendl.) Wendl.	4	Humid tropical Africa
Plectocomia Mart.	c. 16	Himalayas and south China to western Malaysia
Plectocomiopsis Becc.	c. 5	Laos, Thailand, Peninsular Malaysia, Borneo, Sumatra
Retispatha J. Dransf.	–	Synonym of Calamus

In Uhl & Dransfield (1987 Genera Palmarum, 2ºed. 2008), and also Dransfield & Manokaran (1993), a great deal of basic introductory information is available.

Available rattan floras and monographs by region (2002):

Region	Reference
Peninsular Malaysia	Dransfield, 1979
Sabah	Dransfield, 1984
Sarawak	Dransfield, 1992a
Brunei	Dransfield, 1998
Sri Lanka	de Zoysa & Vivekanandan, 1994
India (general)	Basu, 1992
India (Western Ghats)	Renuka, 1992
India (south)	Lakshmana, 1993
Andaman and Nicobar Islands	Renuka, 1995
Bangladesh	Alam, 1990
Papua New Guinea	Johns & Taurereko, 1989a, 1989b (preliminary notes only)
Irian Jaya	Currently (2002) under study at Kew (Baker & Dransfield)
Indonesia	Dransfield and Mogea [to 2002 in prep.]; more field work needed
Laos	Currently (2002) in prep. (Evans)
Thailand	Hodel, 1998
Africa	Currently (2002) in prep. (Sunderland)

Uses by taxon.

The major commercial species of rattan canes as identified for Asia by Dransfield and Manokaran (1993) and for Africa, by Tuley (1995) and Sunderland (1999) (Desmoncus not treated here):

Species	Distribution	Conservation status
Calamus caesius Bl.	Peninsular Malaysia, Sumatra, Borneo, Philippines and Thailand. Also introduced to China and south Pacific for planting	Unknown
Calamus egregius Burr.	Endemic to Hainan island, China, but introduced to southern China for cultivation	Unknown
Calamus exilis Griffith	Peninsular Malaysia and Sumatra	Not threatened
Calamus javensis Bl.	Widespread in Southeast Asia	Not threatened
Calamus manan Miq.	Peninsular Malaysia and Sumatra	Threatened
Calamus merrillii Becc.	Philippines	Threatened
Calamus mindorensis Becc.	Philippines	Unknown
Calamus optimus Becc.	Borneo and Sumatra. Cultivated in Kalimantan	Unknown
Calamus ornatus Bl.	Thailand, Sumatra, Java, Borneo, Sulawesi, to the Philippines	Unknown
Calamus ovoideus Thwaites ex Trimen	Western Sri Lanka	Threatened
Calamus palustris Griffith	Burma, southern China, to Malaysia and the Andaman Islands	Unknown
Calamus pogonacanthus Becc. ex Winkler	Borneo	Unknown
Calamus scipionum Loureiro	Burma, Thailand, Peninsular Malaysia, Sumatra, Borneo to Palawan	Unknown
Calamus simplicifolius Wei	Endemic to Hainan island, China, but introduced to southern China for cultivation	Unknown
Calamus subinermis (eddl. ex Becc.	Sabah, Sarawak, East Kalimantan and Palawan	Unknown
Calamus tetradactylus Hance	Southern China. Introduced to Malaysia	Unknown
Calamus trachycoleus Becc.	South and Central Kalimantan. Introduced into Malaysia for cultivation	Not threatened
Calamus tumidus Furtado	Peninsular Malaysia and Sumatra	Unknown
Calamus wailong Pei & Chen	Southern China	Unknown
Calamus zollingeri Becc.	Sulawesi and the Moluccas	Unknown
Calamus jenkinsianus Griff.	Southern China	Unknown
Calamus validus W.J.Baker	Indonesia, Sulawesi and the Moluccas	Unknown
Calamus crinitus (Blume) Miq.	Peninsula Malaysia and Borneo	Unknown
Eremospatha macrocarpa (Mann & Wendl.) Mann & Wendl.	Tropical Africa from Sierra Leone to Angola	Not threatened
Eremospatha haullevilleana de Wild.	Congo Basin to East Africa	-
Laccosperma robustum (Burr.) J. Dransf.	Cameroon to Congo Basin	-
Laccosperma secundiflorum (P. Beauv.) Mann & Wendl.	Tropical Africa from Sierra Leone to Angola	Not threatened

Utilized Calamus species canes:

Species of Calamus	Notes of utilization
Calamus acanthospathus Griff.	Canes for bridge cables, basketry
Calamus andamanicus Kurz	Excellent large-diameter canes harvested for furniture industry; leaves for thatching
Calamus aruensis Becc.	Excellent quality medium- to large-diameter canes for furniture
Calamus arugda Becc.	Entire canes for handicrafts, furniture, basketry, etc., local and export markets
Calamus axillaris Becc.	Small-diameter canes for basketry, fish traps and tying
Calamus bacularis Becc.	Canes for walking-sticks
Calamus bicolor Becc.	Ornamental use of young plants
Calamus blumei Becc.	Canes of good quality but quantities insufficient for commercial use; canes for baskets and mats
Calamus boniensis Becc. ex Heyne	Probably sold together with other small-diameter canes
Calamus burckianus Becc.	Canes for broom handles
Calamus caesius Bl.	Canes for commercial and traditional uses
Calamus castaneus Becc.	Leaves for thatch; immature fruits in traditional medicine
Calamus ciliaris Bl.	Slender canes for weaving and binding; seedlings used as ornamentals
Calamus conirostris Becc.	Canes of poor quality, rarely used; fruit eaten
Calamus convallium J. Dransf.	Canes
Calamus cumingianus Becc.	Entire canes made into handicrafts, furniture and baskets
Calamus deërratus G. Mann & H. Wendl.	Canes for construction and weaving
Calamus densiflorus Becc.	Canes for making furniture and baskets
Calamus didymocarpus Warb. ex Becc.	Canes inferior but used for local furniture-making
Calamus diepenhorstii Miq.	Canes for tying, cordage, basketry, fish traps and noose traps
Calamus dimorphacanthus Becc. var. dimorphacanthus	Canes used for baskets, bags, tying, etc. for home industries
Calamus discolor Becc.	Young plants as ornamentals; canes for binding or tying
Calamus egregius Burr.	Excellent small- to medium-diameter canes for binding and weaving in furniture; new shoots edible
Calamus elmerianus Becc.	Canes for furniture, handicrafts and home industries
Calamus erioacanthus Becc.	Canes of good quality
Calamus exilis Griff.	Canes for binding, weaving, basketry, handicrafts
Calamus flabellatus Becc.	Canes for tying, binding and weaving
Calamus gamblei Becc.	Canes for furniture
Calamus gibbsianus Becc.	Canes for tying and weaving
Calamus gonospermus Becc.	Edible fruit
Calamus gracilis Roxb.	Canes for handicrafts
Calamus grandifolius Becc.	Canes for furniture
Calamus guruba (Buch-Ham) ex Mart.	Canes for basketry, chair seats
Calamus halconensis (Becc.) Baja-Lapis var. dimorphacanthus Becc.	Canes for chair frames, cables for ferry boats, hauling logs and as rigging on small sailboats; split canes for mats, basketry, fish traps, chair seats
Calamus heteroideus Bl.	Canes for cordage
Calamus hispidulus Becc.	Canes for weaving
Calamus hookerianus Becc.	Canes for furniture, basketry
Calamus huegelianus Mart.	Canes for basketry, chair frames, etc.
Calamus inermis T. Anders.	Canes for police sticks, chair frames
Calamus inops Becc. ex Heyne	Actual use of small- to medium-diameter canes not known
Calamus insignis Becc.	Split canes for basketry, cordage; spiny leaf-sheaths as food graters
Calamus javensis Bl.	Canes for cordage, basketry, noose traps, musical instruments; edible raw cabbage as medicine; spiny leaf-sheaths formerly used to make food graters
Calamus koordersianus Becc.	Canes locally for basket frames
Calamus laevigatus Mart.	Extensively collected as small-diameter cane, end-uses not documented
Calamus latifolius Roxb.	Canes for basketry, walking-sticks, furniture frames; split canes for chair seats
Calamus leiocaulis Becc. ex Heyne	Small-diameter canes extensively used to make furniture for local and export markets
Calamus leptospadix Griff.	Canes for basketry and chair seats
Calamus leptostachys Becc. ex Heyne	Excellent small-diameter canes for furniture and handicrafts for local and export markets
Calamus longisetus Griff.	Coarse cane for furniture; leaves for thatch; edible fruit
Calamus longispathus Ridl.	Young leaves occasionally as cigarette paper; fruits as medicine
Calamus luridus Becc.	Canes split for tying and binding
Calamus manan Miq.	Most desirable large-diameter canes for furniture
Calamus manillensis (Mart.) H. Wendl.	Edible fruit; canes of inferior quality for tying
Calamus marginatus (Bl.) Mart.	Poor quality but durable canes for basket frames and walking-sticks
Calamus mattanensis Becc.	Canes occasionally used to make coarse baskets
Calamus megaphyllus Becc.	Canes for basketry and tying
Calamus melanorhynchus Becc.	Canes for basketry and handicrafts
Calamus merrillii Becc.	Entire canes for chair frames, ferry boat cables, hauling logs, sailboat rigging; split canes for basketry, chairs, fish traps, etc.
Calamus microcarpus Becc.	Canes for basketry
Calamus microsphaerion Becc.	Entire canes for basketry
Calamus minahassae Becc.	Canes as cordage
Calamus mindorensis Becc.	Popular large-diameter canes for furniture; split canes for basketry, cordage
Calamus mitis Becc.	Canes for basketry and tying
Calamus moseleyanus Becc.	Canes for furniture
Calamus multinervis Becc.	Canes for furniture
Calamus muricatus Becc.	Cabbage eaten
Calamus myriacanthus Becc.	Canes for walking-sticks, cages, basket frames
Calamus nagbettai Fernandez & Dey	Canes for basketry
Calamus nambariensis Becc.	Canes for handicrafts
Calamus optimus Becc.	Canes used to make mats, for weaving, to bind furniture and cordage
Calamus ornatus Bl.	Major use of canes for furniture; also for walking-sticks, handles for implements and flooring; leaves, cabbage and roots as medicine; fruits occasionally eaten
Calamus ovoideus Thwaites ex Trimen	Split canes for basketry; entire canes for furniture frames; split cane cores for crude woven products
Calamus oxleyanus Teysm. & Binnend. ex Miq.	Canes for walking-sticks
Calamus palustris Griff.	Canes excellent for furniture frames
Calamus pandanosmus Furt.	Canes
Calamus paspalanthus Becc.	Seedlings as potential ornamental; ripe fruit pickled and young shoot eaten
Calamus pedicellatus Becc. ex Heyne	Canes apparently of good quality for furniture
Calamus perakensis Becc.	Canes occasionally used for walking-sticks
Calamus peregrinus Furt.	Robust canes of good quality for furniture
Calamus pilosellus Becc.	Canes of good appearance but probably only for local use
Calamus pogonacanthus Becc. ex H. Winkler	Canes of good quality for tying, binding and making coarse mats
Calamus poilanei Conrad	Canes for handicrafts
Calamus polystachys Becc.	Coarse canes used for broom handles
Calamus pseudorivalis Becc.	Canes for furniture
Calamus pseudotenuis Becc.	Canes for basketry
Calamus pseudoulur Becc.	Canes for basketry, etc.
Calamus ramulosus Becc.	Canes for furniture
Calamus reyesianus Becc.	Canes of small diameter use for furniture and basketry, local and international
Calamus rhomboideus Bl.	Canes possibly used to make baskets and mats
Calamus rhytidomus Becc.	Canes used locally for binding
Calamus rotang Linn.	Canes for basketry, chair seats
Calamus rudentum Lour.	Canes for handicrafts; edible fruit
Calamus ruvidus Becc.	Canes used for basketry and tying
Calamus scabridulus Becc.	Canes split for tying, thatching and cordage
Calamus scipionum Lour.	Canes for making moderate-quality furniture; walking-sticks, umbrella handles, etc.
Calamus sedens J. Dransf.	Canes sometimes used to make walking-sticks
Calamus semoi Becc.	Excellent quality cane; under cultivation in gardens
Calamus simplex Becc.	Canes for basketry
Calamus simplicifolius Wei	Good medium-diameter cane for furniture, binding, weaving, basketry, etc.; new shoots edible
Calamus siphonospathus Mart.	Canes for basketry and tying
Calamus solitarius T. Evans et al.	Canes for handicrafts
Calamus spinifolius Becc.	Canes for basketry and tying
Calamus subinermis H. Wendl. ex Becc.	Canes for furniture frames; cabbage cooked as a vegetable; fruit sometimes eaten
Calamus symphysipus Becc.	Canes for furniture
Calamus tenuis Roxb.	Canes for basketry; fruits and young shoots eaten
Calamus tetradactylus Hance	Small-diameter canes for handicrafts, basketry and furniture
Calamus thwaitesii Becc.	Canes for furniture
Calamus tomentosus Becc.	Canes for tying and binding
Calamus trachycoleus Becc.	Canes used as skin peels for weaving chair seats and back; unsplit for furniture; basketry, mats, fish traps, cordage
Calamus travancoricus Bedd. ex Becc. & Hook	Canes for handicrafts and furniture
Calamus trispermus Becc.	Canes for furniture
Calamus tumidus Furt.	Canes for furniture
Calamus ulur Becc.	Split canes for cordage
Calamus unifarius H. Wendl.	Canes locally for furniture
Calamus usitatus Becc.	Canes for basketry, furniture and handicrafts
Calamus vidalianus Becc.	Canes for furniture
Calamus viminalis Willd.	Canes locally for basketry and matting
Calamus wailong S.J. Pei & S.Y. Chen	Canes for weaving and furniture
Calamus warburgii K. Schum.	Canes locally for basket frames
Calamus ollingeri Becc.	Canes for furniture frames

Other traditional uses of rattans by species:

Product / Use	Species
Fruit eaten	Calamus conirostris; Calamus longisetus; Calamus manillensis; Calamus merrillii; Calamus ornatus; Calamus paspalanthus; Calamus subinermis; Calamus viminalis; Calamus calospathus (syn. Calospatha scortechinii); Calamus ingens
Palm heart eaten	Calamus deerratus; Calamus egregius; Calamus javensis; Calamus muricatus; Calamus paspalanthus; Calamus siamensis; Calamus simplicifolius; Calamus subinermis; Calamus tenuis; Calamus viminalis; Calamus melanochaetes (syns. Daemonorops melanochaetes, Daemonorops fissa, Daemonorops margaritae, Daemonorops schmidtiana); Calamus longibracteatus (syn. Daemonorops longispatha); Calamus periacanthus (syn. Daemonorops periacantha); Calamus scapigerus (syn. Daemonorops scapigera); Calamus sparsiflorus (syn. Daemonorops sparsiflora); Laccosperma secundiflorum; Plectocompiopsis geminiflora (and Calamus jenkinsianus.)
Fruit used in traditional medicine	Calamus castaneus; Calamus longispathus; Calamus gracilipes (syn. Daemonorops didymophylla)
Palm heart in traditional medicine	Calamus exilis; Calamus javensis; Calamus ornatus; Calamus melanochaetes (syn. Daemonorops grandis); Korthalsia rigida
Fruit as source of red resin exuded between scales, used medicinally and as a dye (one source of "dragon's blood")	Calamus gracilipes (syn. Daemonorops didymophylla); Calamus draco (syn. Daemonorops draco); Calamus maculatus (syn. Daemonorops maculata); Calamus micracanthus (syn. Daemonorops micracantha); Calamus propinquus (syn. Daemonorops propinqua); Calamus ruber (syn. Daemonorops rubra)
Leaves for thatching	Calamus andamanicus; Calamus castaneus; Calamus longisetus; Calamus calicarpus (syn. Daemonorops calicarpa); Calamus oblongus (syn. Daemonorops elongata); Calamus melanochaetes (syns. Daemonorops grandis, Daemonorops manii); Calamus ingens
Leaflet as cigarette paper	Calamus longispathus; Calamus leptopus (syn. Daemonorops leptopus)
Leaves chewed as vermifuge	Laccosperma secundiflorum
Roots used as treatment for syphilis	Eremospatha macrocarpa
Leaf sheath used as toothbrush	Eremospatha wendlandiana; Oncocalamus sp.
Leaf sheath/petiole as grater	Calamus sp. (undescribed sp. from Bali);
Rachis for fishing pole	Calamus melanochaetes (syn. Daemonorops grandis); Laccosperma secundiflorum

=== Etymology ===
The name "rattan" is first attested in English in the 1650s. It is derived from the Malay name rotan. Probably ultimately from rautan (from raut, 'to trim' or 'to pare').

== Ecology ==
Many rattan species also form mutualistic relationships with ant species. They provide ant shelters (myrmecodomatia) like hollow spines, funnel-shaped leaves, or leaf sheath extensions (ochreae). The rattans in turn, gain protection from herbivores.

== Conservation ==
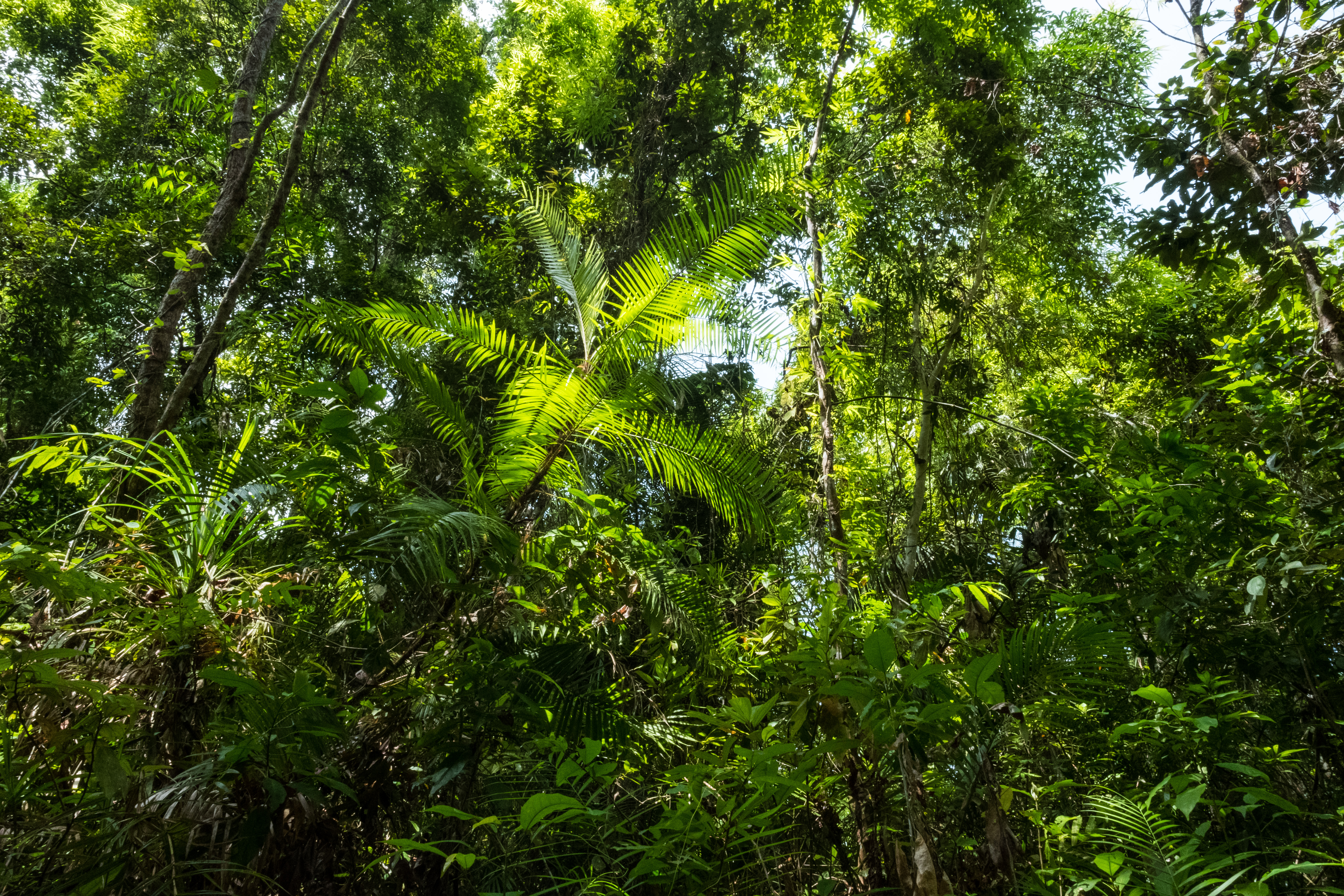
Rattan (center) in an old-growth forest in Palawan, Philippines

Rattans are threatened with overexploitation, as harvesters are cutting stems too young and reducing their ability to resprout. Unsustainable harvesting of rattan can lead to forest degradation, affecting overall forest ecosystem services. Processing can also be polluting. The use of toxic chemicals and petrol in the processing of rattan affects soil, air and water resources, and also ultimately people's health. Meanwhile, the conventional method of rattan production is threatening the plant's long-term supply, and the income of workers.

Rattans also exhibit rapid population growths in disturbed forest edges due to higher light availability than in the closed-canopy old-growth tropical forests. Although this can mean increased rattan abundance for economic exploitation, it can also be problematic in long-term conservation efforts.

Rattan harvesting from the wild in most rattan-producing countries requires permits. These include the Philippines, Sri Lanka, India, Malaysia, Laos, Ghana, and Cameroon. In addition, the Philippines also imposes an annual allowable cut in an effort to conserve rattan resources. Rattan cultivation (both monoculture and intercropping) is also being researched and pioneered in some countries, though it is still a young industry and only constitutes a minority of the rattan resources harvested annually.

== Uses ==
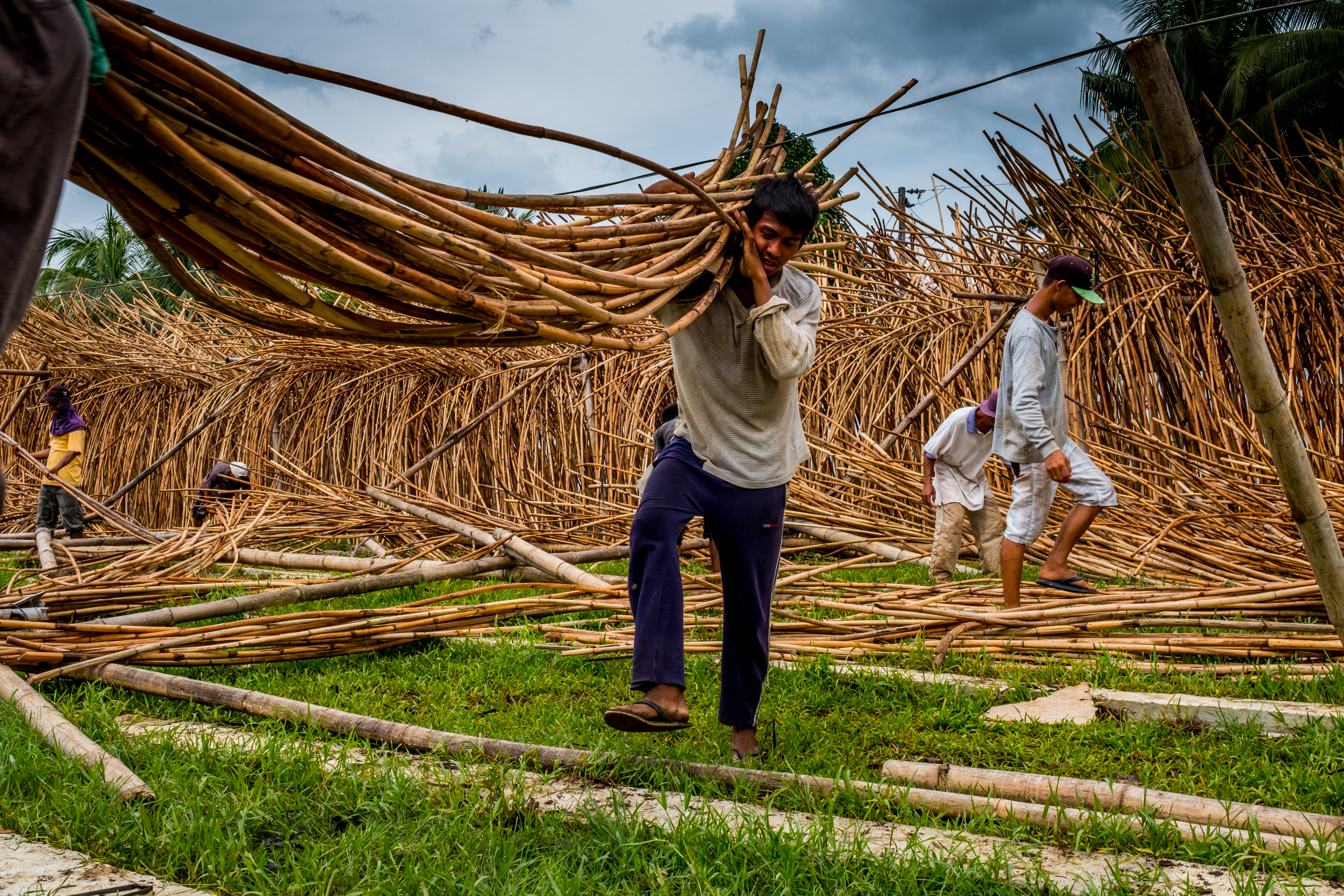
Wild-harvested rattan canes being treated and dried in Palawan, Philippines

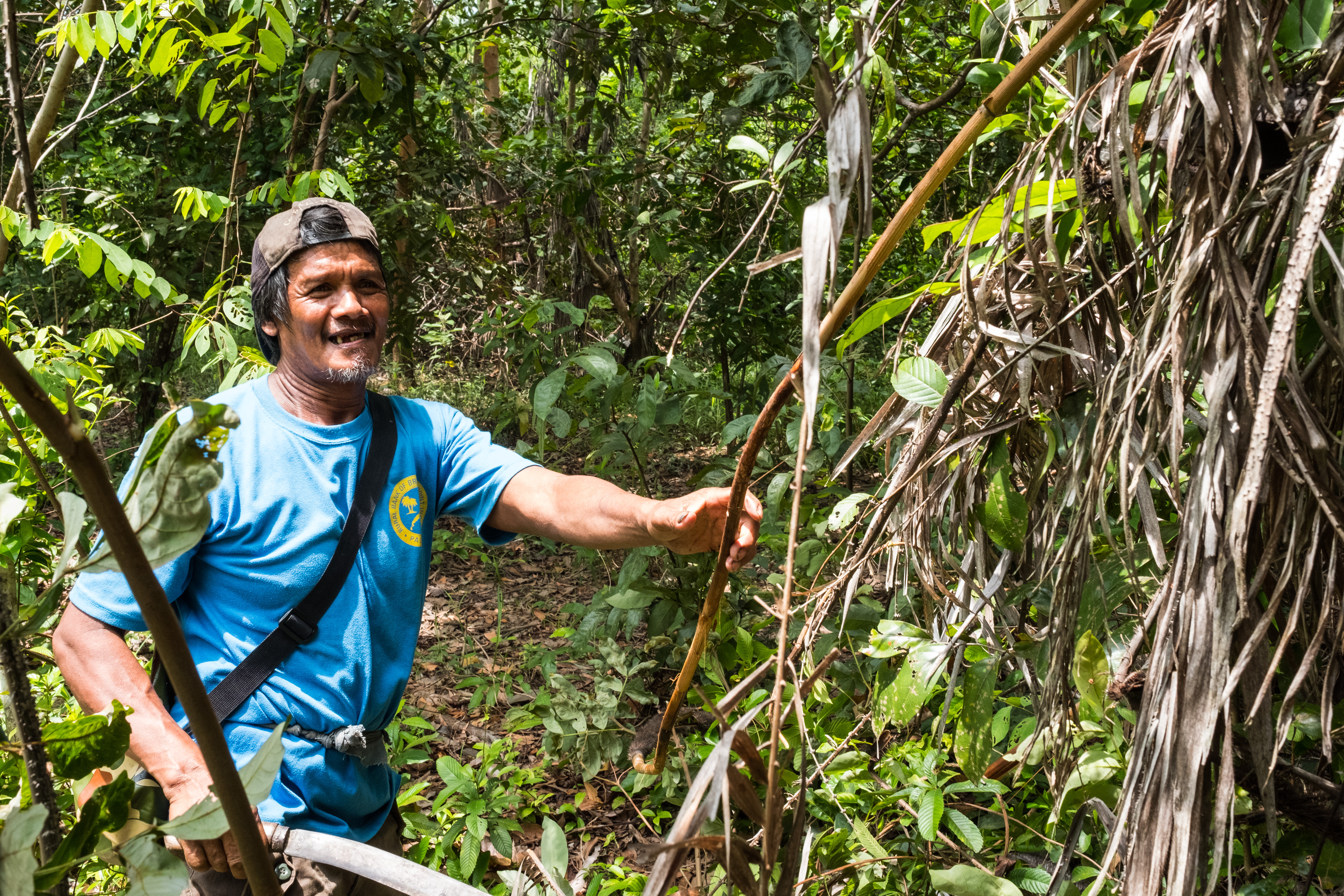
Worker harvesting rattan from an old-growth forest in the Philippines

In forests where rattan grows, its economic value can play a crucial role in conservation efforts. By offering an alternative source of income, rattan harvesting can deter loggers from engaging in timber logging. Harvesting rattan canes is simpler and requires less sophisticated tools compared to logging operations. Furthermore, rattan grows rapidly, which facilitates quicker replenishment compared to tropical wood species. This economic incentive supports forest maintenance by providing a profitable crop that complements rather than competes with trees. However, the long-term profitability and utility of rattan compared to other alternatives remain subjects of ongoing evaluation and study.

Cleaned rattan stems with the leaf sheaths removed are superficially similar to bamboo. Unlike bamboo, rattan stems are not hollow. Most (70%) of the world's rattan population exists in Indonesia, distributed among the islands Borneo, Sulawesi, and Sumbawa. The rest of the world's supply comes from the Philippines, Sri Lanka, Malaysia, Bangladesh and Assam, India.

=== Food source ===
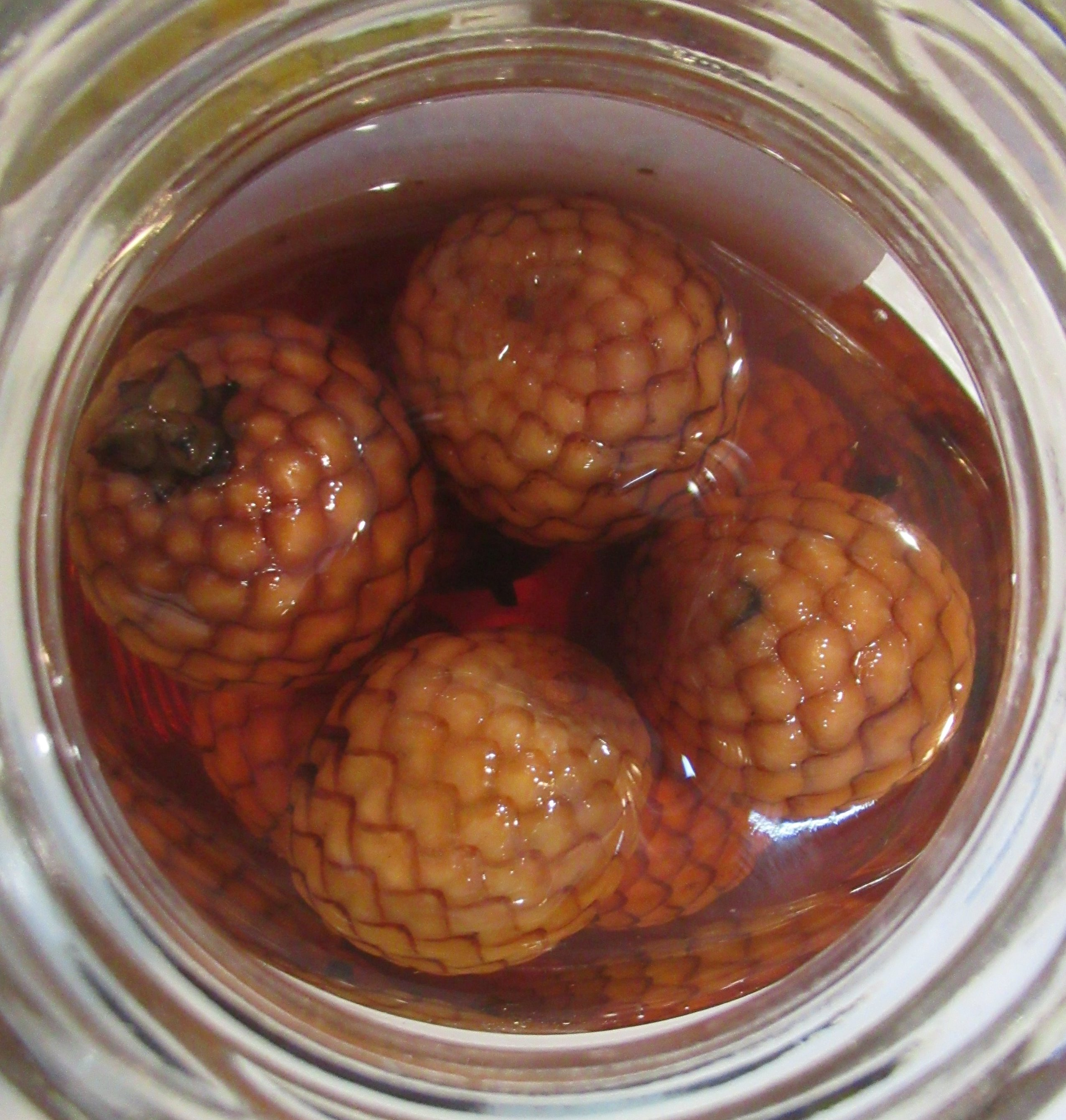
Pickled lituko (Calamus manillensis fruits) from Nueva Vizcaya, Philippines

Some rattan fruits are edible, with a sour taste akin to citrus. The fruit of some rattans exudes a red resin called dragon's blood; this resin was thought to have medicinal properties in antiquity and was used as a dye for violins, among other things. The resin normally results in a wood with a light peach hue.

The stem tips are rich in starch, and can be eaten raw or roasted. Long stems can be cut to obtain potable water. The palm heart can also be eaten raw or cooked.

=== Medicinal potential ===
In early 2010, scientists in Italy announced that rattan wood would be used in a new "wood to bone" process for the production of artificial bone. The process takes small pieces of rattan and places them in a furnace. Calcium and carbon are added. The wood is then further heated under intense pressure in another oven-like machine, and a phosphate solution is introduced. This process produces almost an exact replica of bone material. The process takes about 10 days. At the time of the announcement the bone was being tested in sheep, and there had been no signs of rejection. Particles from the sheep's bodies have migrated to the "wood bone" and formed long, continuous bones. The new bone-from-wood programme is being funded by the European Union. By 2023, experimental implants into humans were taking place. A scientific payload to study a Rattan-wood artificial bone scaffold was sent to the International Space Station on SpaceX CRS-34.

=== Rattan handicrafts and furniture ===
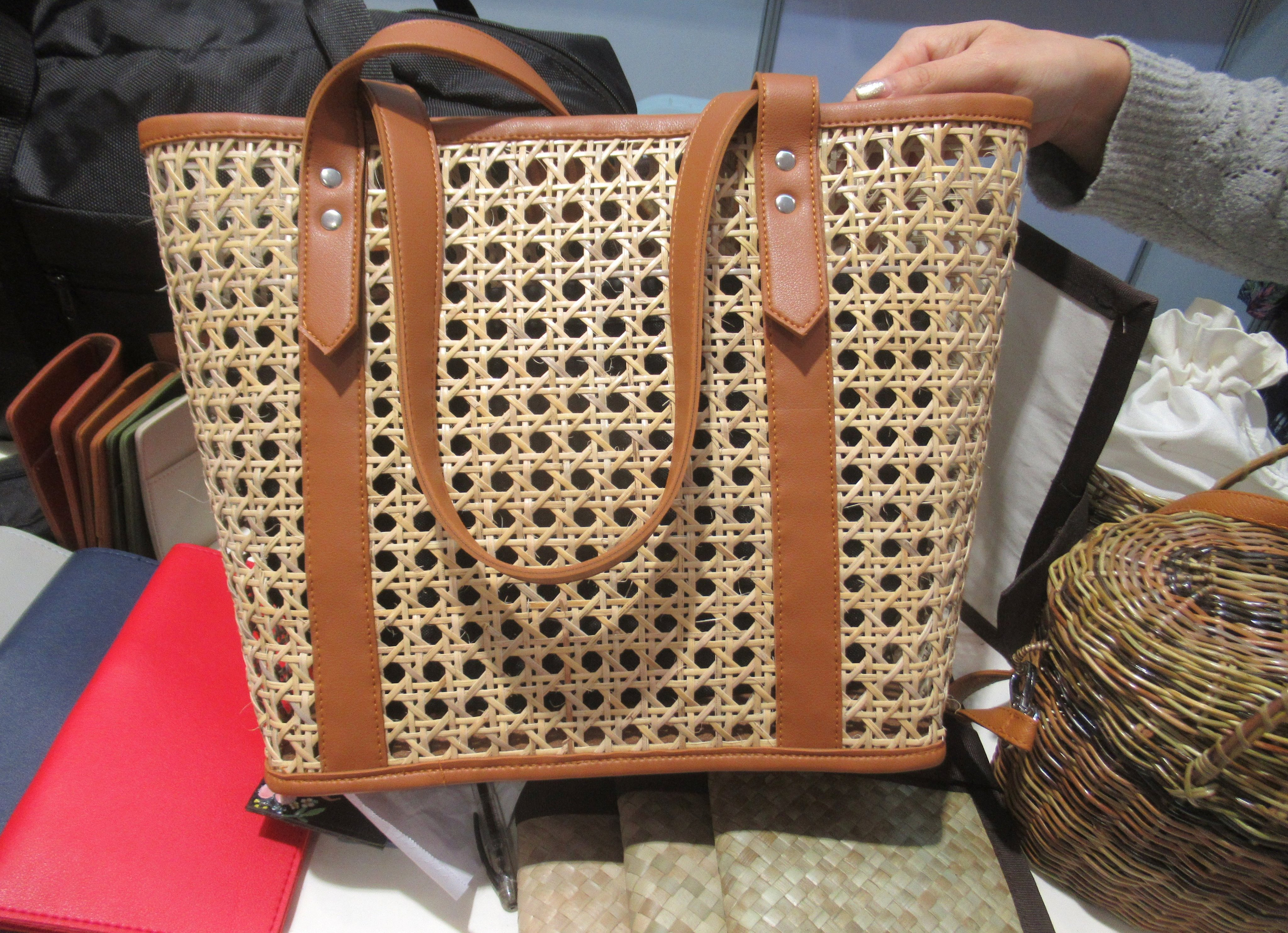
Solihiya, a traditional woven rattan pattern from the Philippines

Rattan is extensively used for making handicrafts (like baskets), furniture, and decorative art. Generally, raw rattan is processed into several products to be used as materials. Whole rattan stems can be used like wood as the framework for furniture and larger handicrafts. It can accept paints and stains much like other types of wood. The outer layers can be pared off into strips, to be used as rattan weaving material. Rattan is a popular material for furniture-making, mainly because it is lightweight, durable, and, to a certain extent, flexible and suitable for outdoor use.

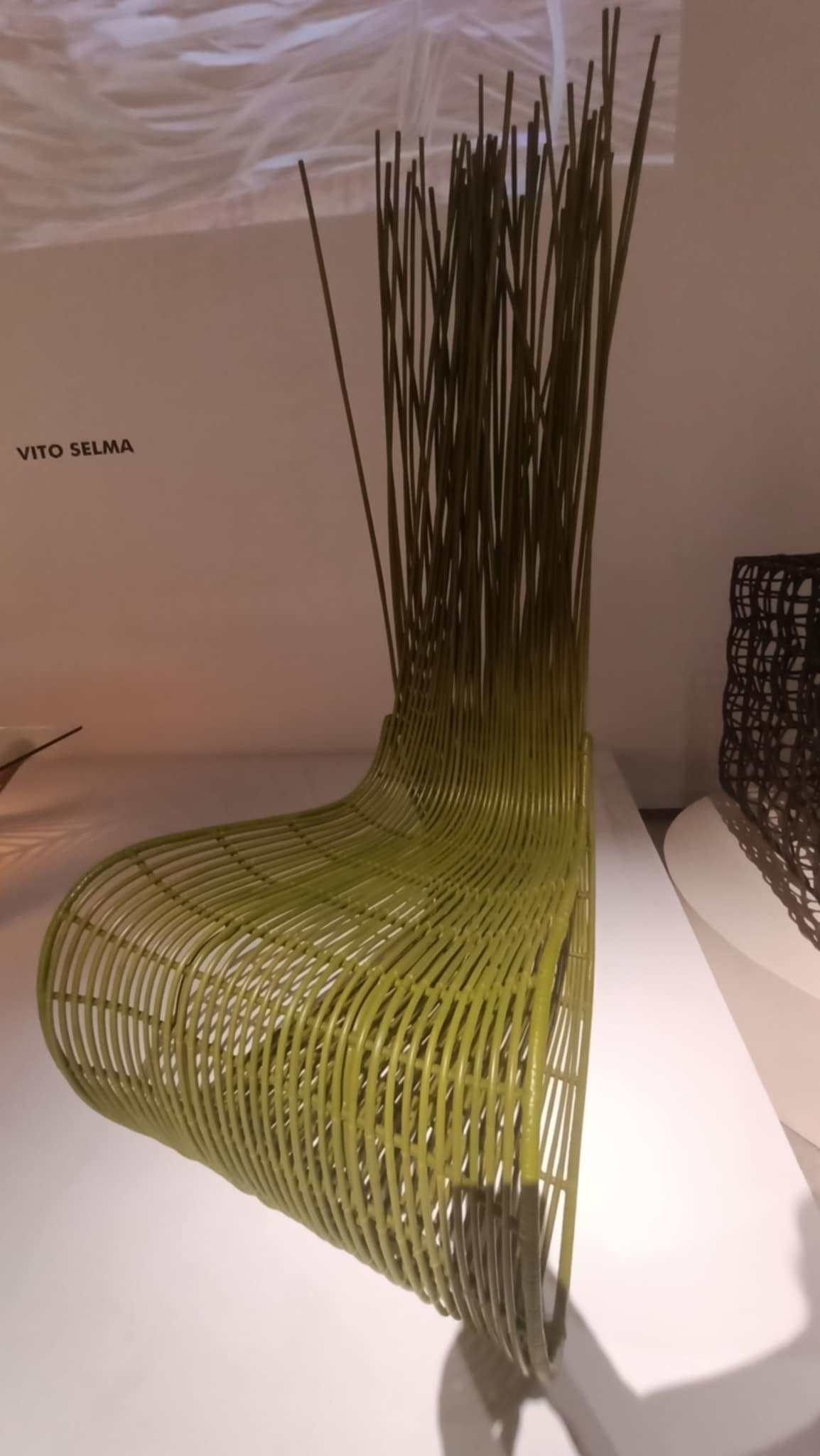
The Yoda Chair, one of the most iconic rattan chair designs of Filipino industrial designer Kenneth Cobonpue

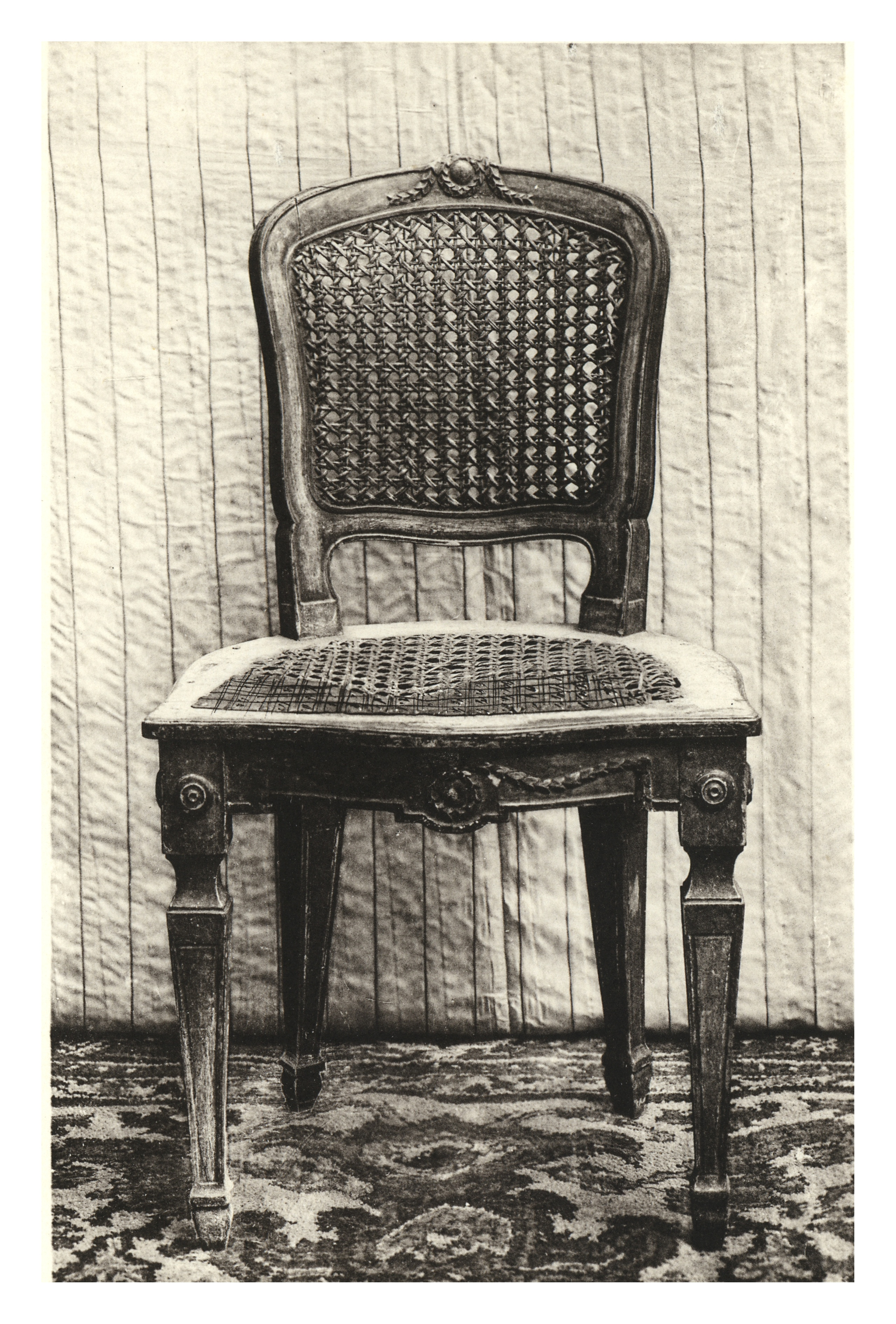
Wiener Geflecht Chair, Josephinism style, typical Viennese, around 1780. The seat and back wickerwork panels are woven of rattan, while the frame is hardwood.

Woven rattan panels in various patterns are also used for furniture whose framework can be made of rattan canes or from hardwood. One of the most common weaving patterns is the solihiya (also spelled sulihiya, from Spanish celosía, "latticework"), a traditional open weaving pattern originating from the Philippines. It features a distinctive repetitive grid of sunburst shapes with large hexagonal gaps, allowing air to freely flow through, a necessity in the hot tropics. This weaving pattern (originally used in wall panels and baskets) became incorporated into traditional long-armed lounge chairs (butaca) and for siesta day beds (papag) during the Spanish colonial period of the Philippines before spreading throughout Southeast Asia.

The standard six-way solihiya weave with hexagonal holes is more accurately known as the sampayan. It has several variations, including a simpler four-way weave (sinulid), more intricate diamond weaves (used for high-end furniture and decorative items), and stronger double weaves (which feature two layers of rattan woven together for extra strength).

In Europe, an identical pattern to the six-way solihiya weave is known as the Wiener Geflecht ("Viennese Braiding"), as it first became popular in 18th century Vienna. This pattern was later prominently used by Thonet for their No. 14 chair.

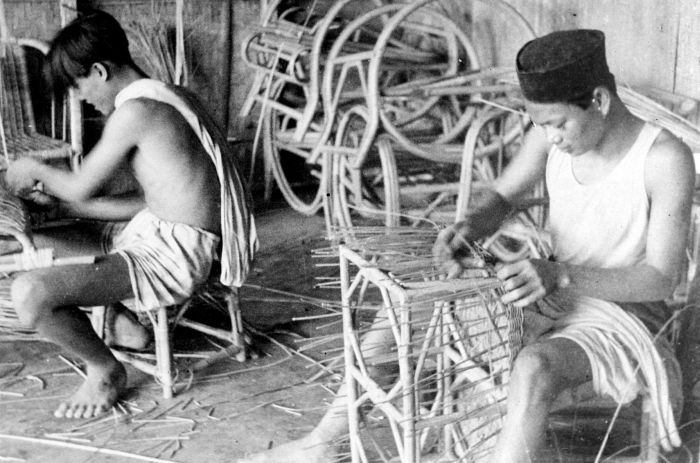
Indonesians making rattan furniture, c. 1948

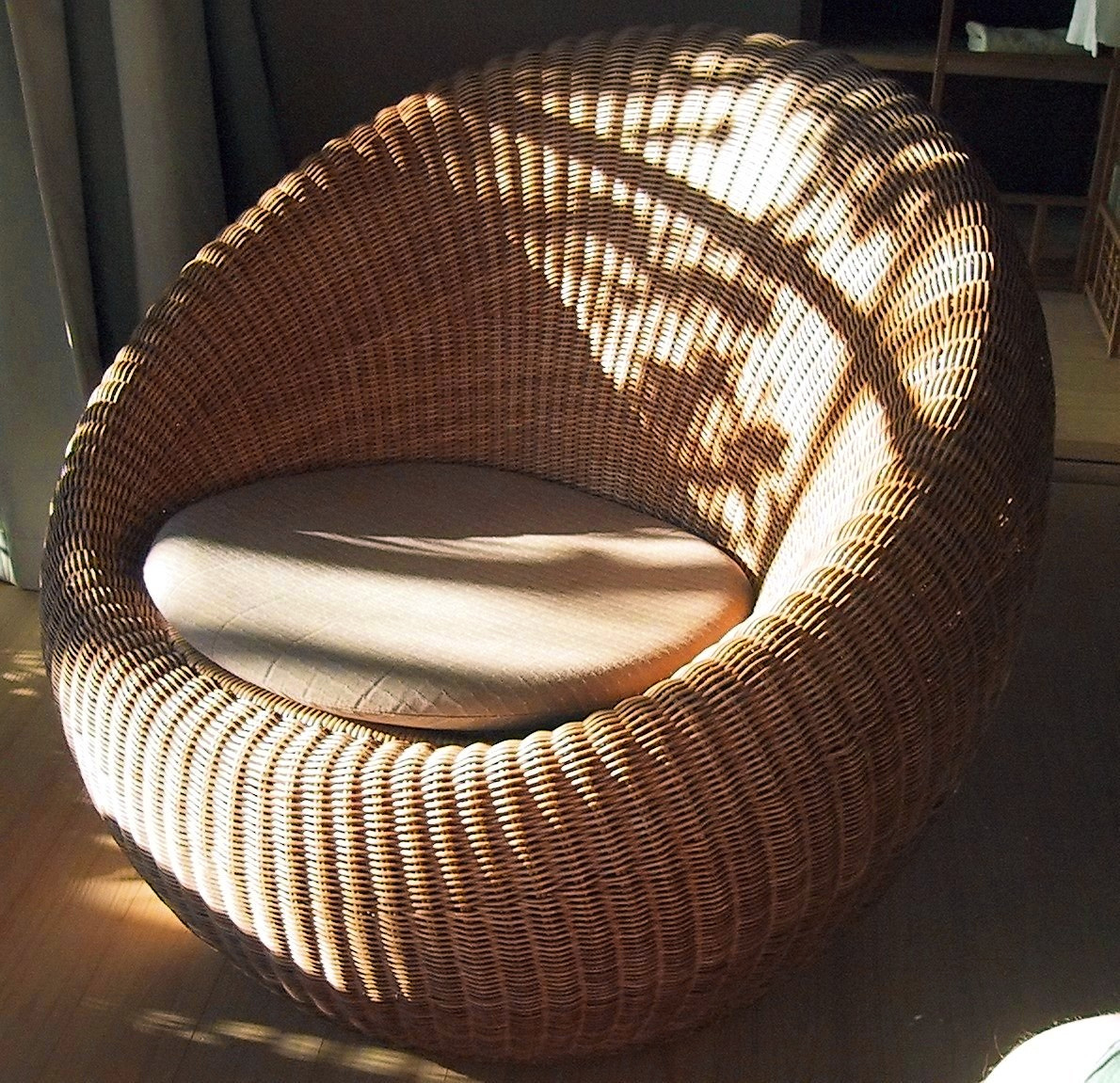
A rattan chair

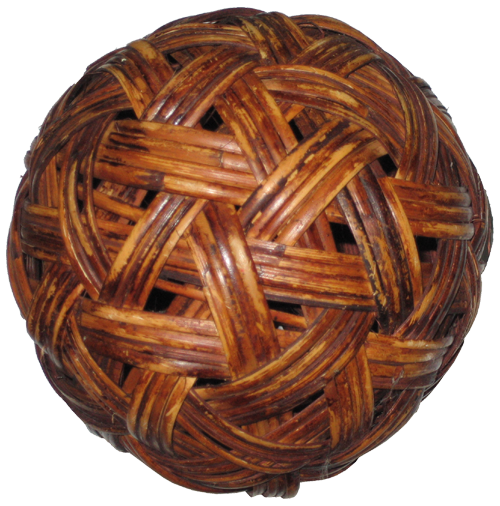
A rattan ball of Sepak takraw

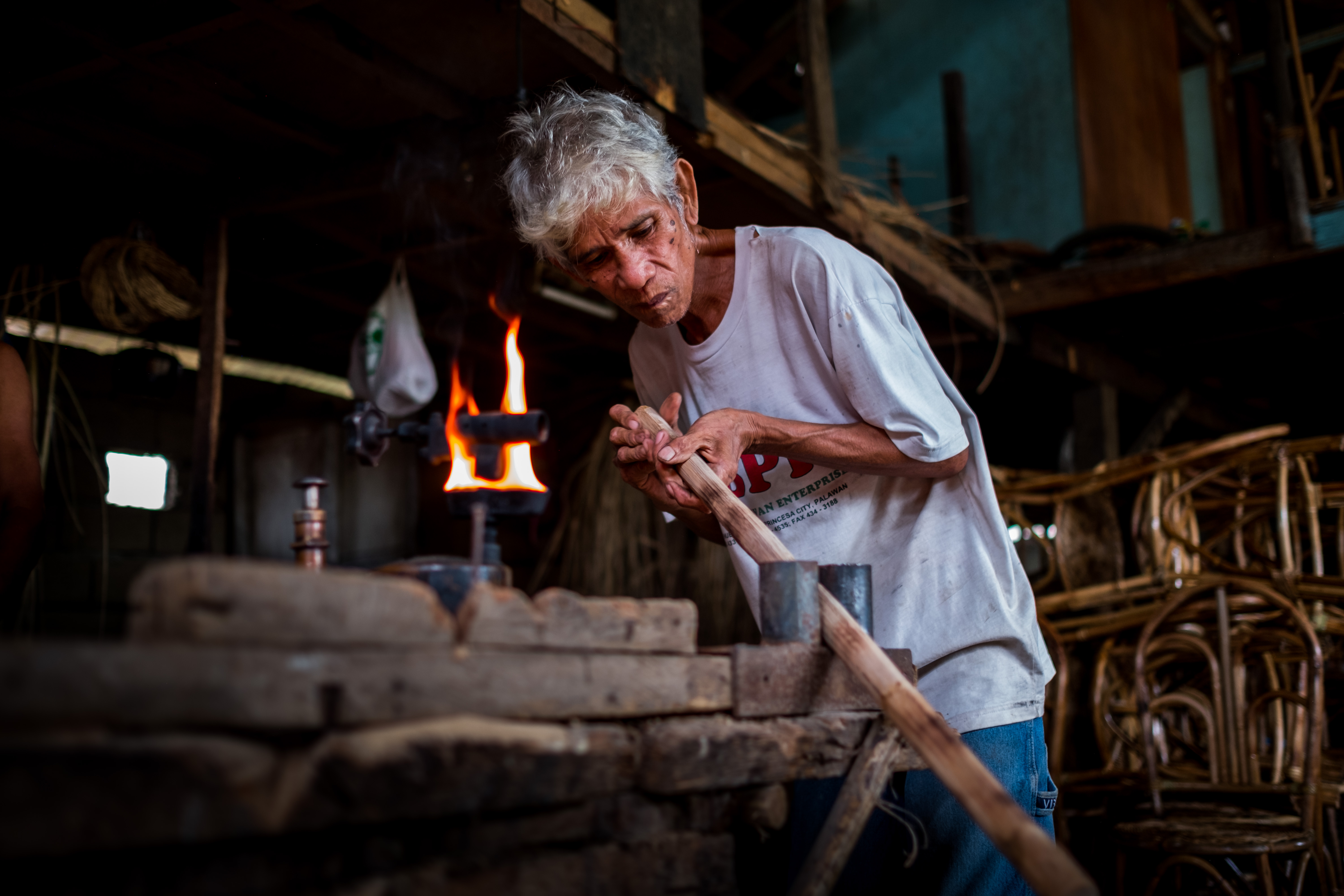
Craftsman in the Philippines heat bending rattan for furniture-making

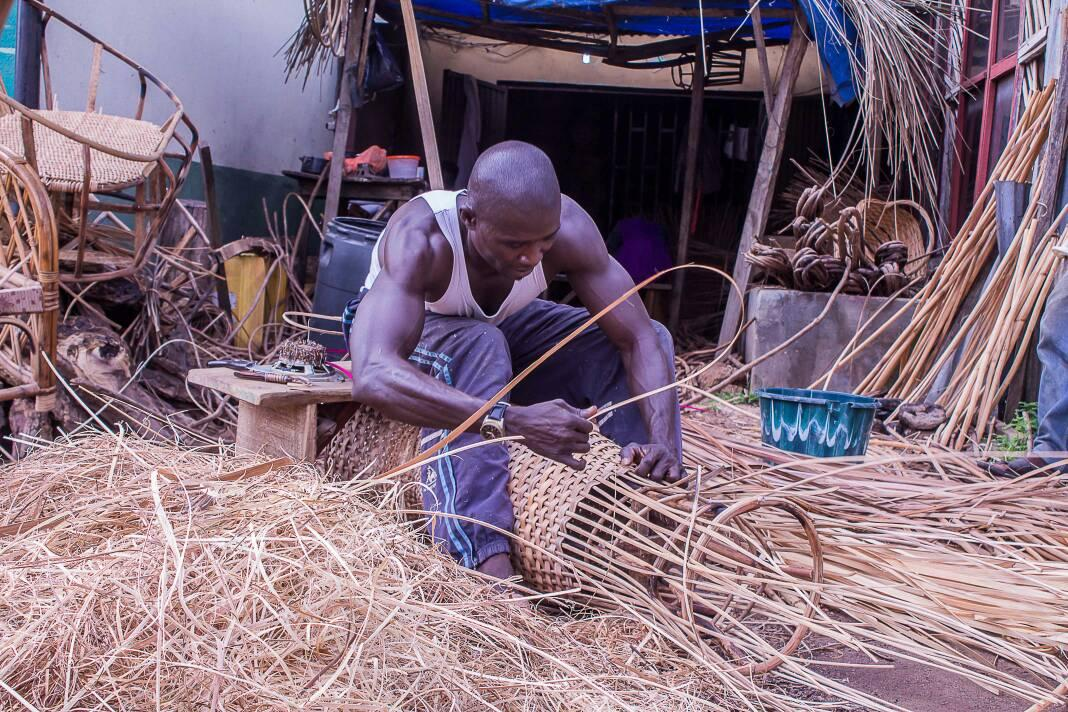
Craftsman weaving a basket made from split rattan in Nigeria

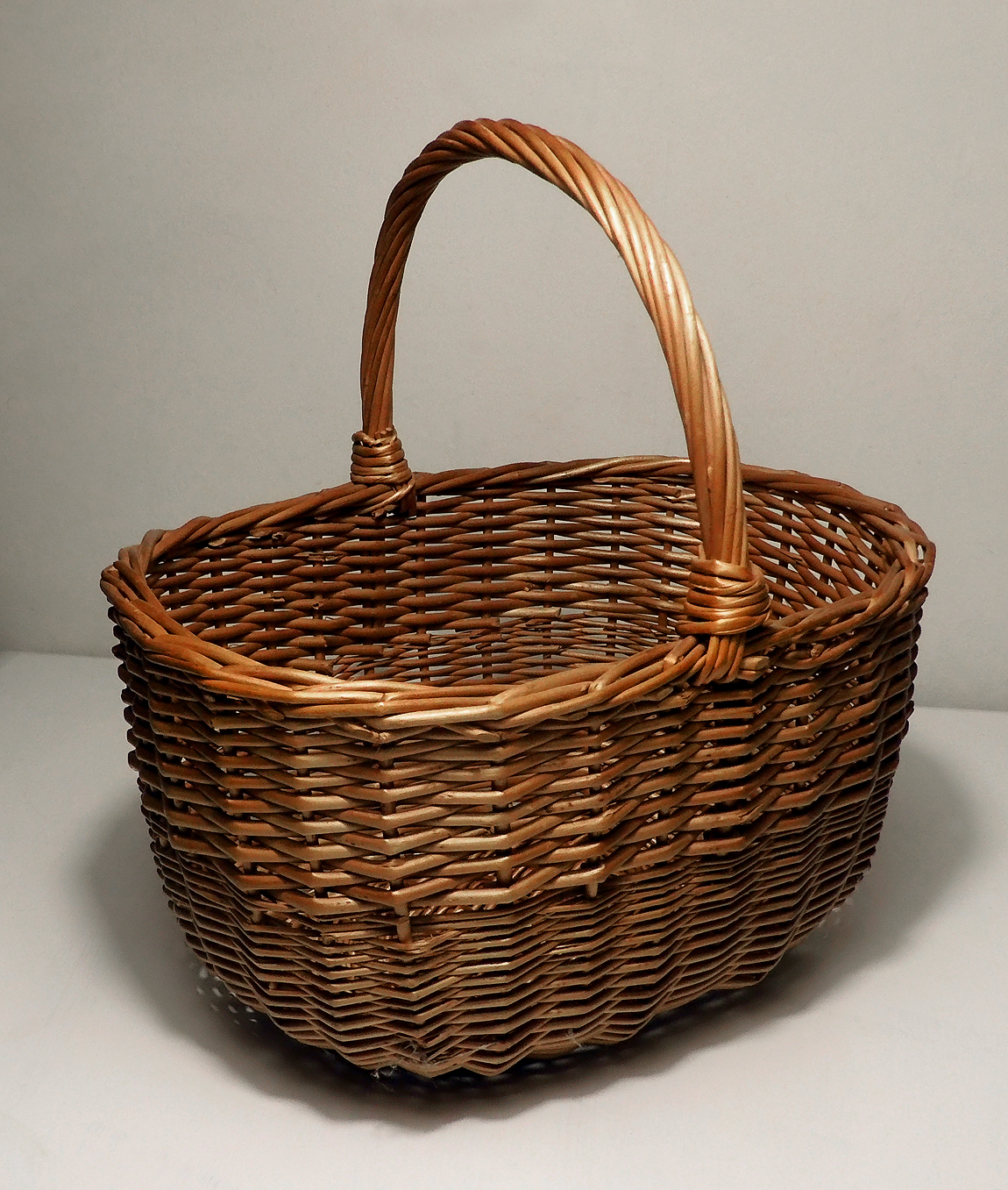
A basket made of rattan

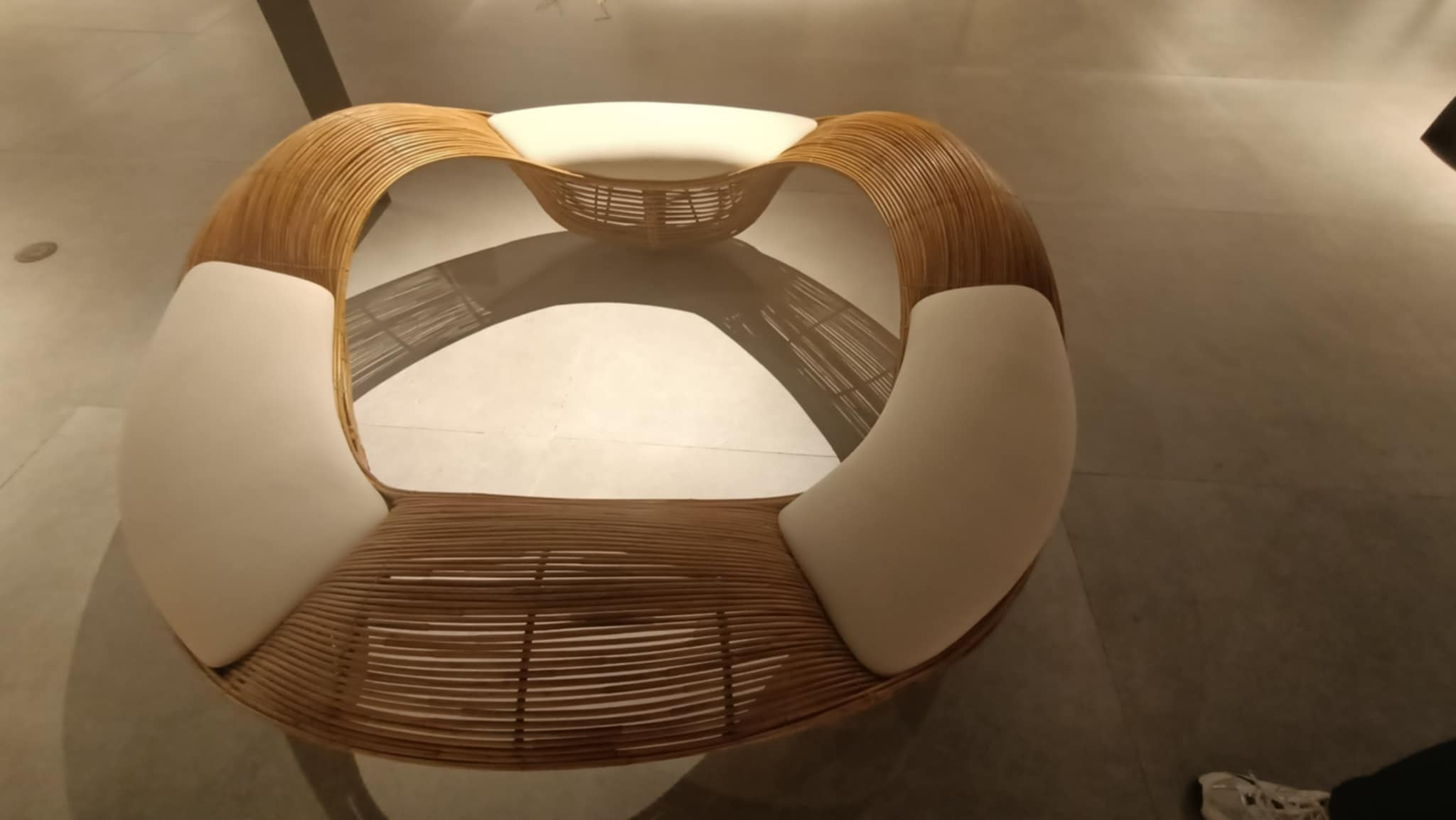
Bawod ("Wave") rattan chair by Filipino industrial designer Kenneth Cobonpue, a modern design using traditional Cebuano basket-weaving techniques

=== Clothing ===
Traditionally, the women of the Wemale ethnic group of Seram Island, Indonesia wore rattan girdles around their waist.

=== Corporal punishment ===
Thin rattan canes were the standard implement for school corporal punishment in England and Wales, and are still used for this purpose in schools in Malaysia, Singapore, and several African countries. Similar canes are used for military punishments in the Singapore Armed Forces. Heavier canes, also of rattan, are used for judicial corporal punishments in Aceh, Brunei, Malaysia, and Singapore.

=== Wicks ===
Rattan is the preferred natural material used to wick essential oils in aroma reed diffusers (commonly used in aromatherapy, or merely to scent closets, passageways, and rooms), because each rattan reed contains 20 or more permeable channels that wick the oil from the container up the stem and release fragrance into the air, through an evaporation diffusion process. In contrast, reeds made from bamboo contain nodes that inhibit the passage of essential oils.

=== Shelter material ===
Most natives or locals from the rattan rich countries employ the aid of this sturdy plant in their home building projects. It is heavily used as a housing material in rural areas. The skin of the plant or wood is primarily used for weaving.

=== Tools and equipment ===
Due to its durability and resistance to splintering, sections of rattan can be used as canes, crooks for high-end umbrellas, or staves for martial arts. Rattan sticks 70 cm (28 inches) long, called baston, are used in Filipino martial arts, especially Arnis/Eskrima/Kali and for the striking weapons in the Society for Creative Anachronism's full-contact "armoured combat".

Rattan cane is also used traditionally to make polo mallets, though only a small portion of cane harvested (roughly 3%) is strong, flexible, and durable enough to be made into sticks for polo mallets, and popularity of rattan mallets is waning next the more modern variant, fibrecanes.

Along with birch and bamboo, rattan is a common material used for the handles in percussion mallets, especially mallets for keyboard percussion, e.g., marimba, vibraphone, xylophone, etc.

=== Weaponry ===
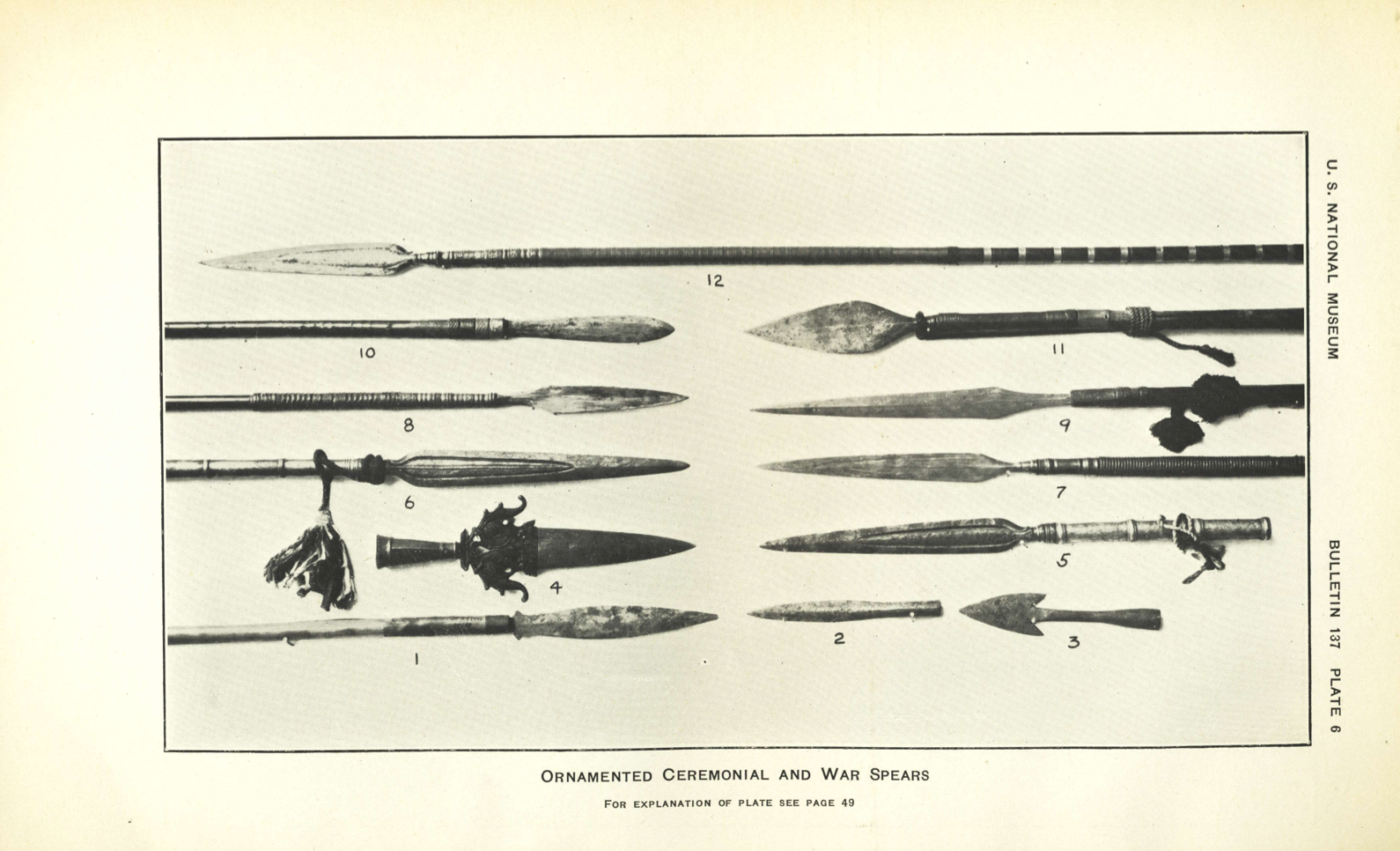
Sibat spears from the Philippines

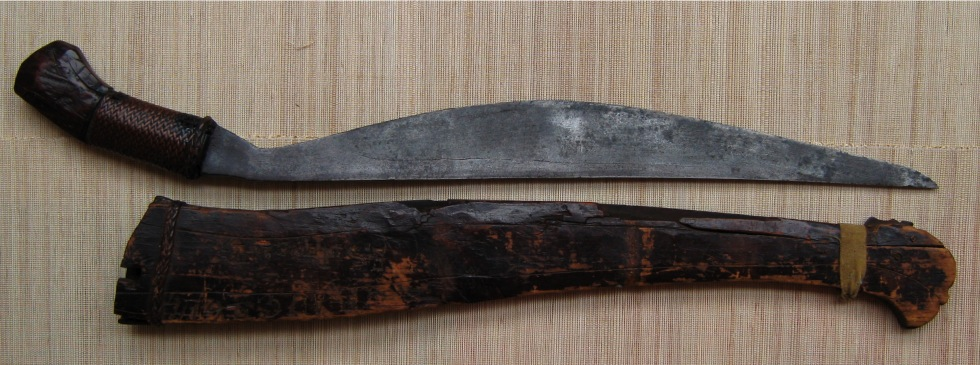
Rattan ferrule on the hilt of a Visayan talibong sword from the Philippines, c. early 20th century

Fire-hardened rattan were commonly used as the shafts of Philippine spears collectively known as sibat. They were fitted with a variety of iron spearheads and ranged from short throwing versions to heavy thrusting weapons. They were used for hunting, fishing, or warfare (both land and naval warfare). The rattan shafts of war spears are usually elaborately ornamented with carvings and metal inlays. Arnis also makes prominent use of rattan as "arnis sticks", commonly called yantok or baston. Their durability and weight makes it ideal for training with complex execution of techniques as well as being a choice of weapon, even against bladed objects.

Round shields known as taming from various ethnic groups in the Philippines and parts of Borneo can also be made from tightly-woven rattan.

Rattan shields were historically used in ancient, medieval and early modern China and Korea. According to some contemporary sources, they were reasonably effective against both arrows and early firearms.

It sees also prominent use in battle re-enactments as stand-ins to potentially lethal weapons.

Rattan can also be used to build a functional sword that delivers a non-lethal but similar impact compared to steel counterparts.

== See also ==
- Amakan
- Sennit
