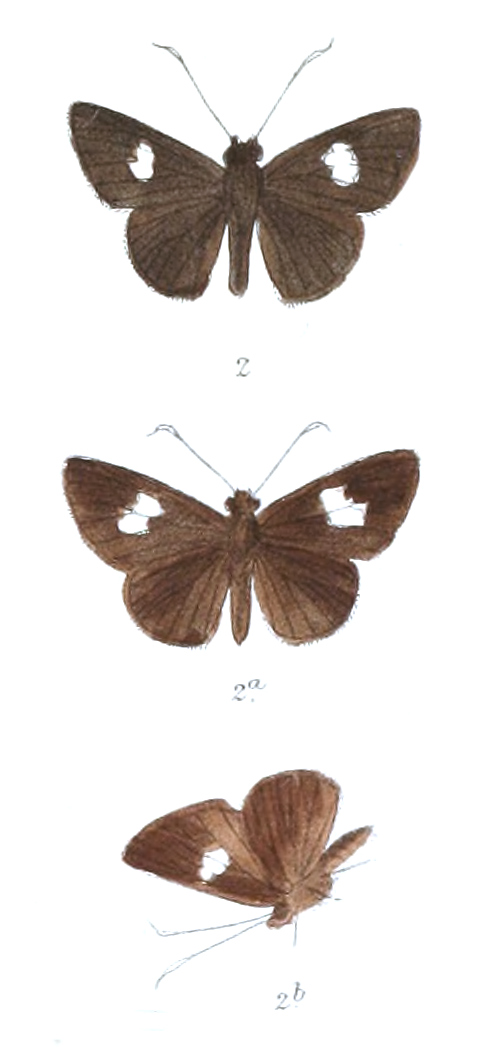

Scientific classification
- Kingdom: Animalia
- Phylum: Arthropoda
- Clade: Pancrustacea
- Class: Insecta
- Order: Lepidoptera
- Family: Hesperiidae
- Genus: Oerane
- Species: O. microthyrus

Binomial name
- Oerane microthyrus Mabille 1883

Synonyms
- Plesioneura microthyrus Mabille, 1883; Notocrypta neaera de Nicéville, 1891; Oerane neaera pusilla Fruhstorfer, 1911; Oerane drymo Mabille, 1913

= Oerane microthyrus =

Species of butterfly

Oerane microthyrus is a species of butterfly in the family Hesperiidae. It was described by Paul Mabille in 1883 and is found in the Indomalayan realm. Males are above quite brown, the females have differently shaped white spots on the forewing. The larvae feed on Calamus oblongus (syn. Daemonorops oblonga).

== Subspecies ==
- O. m. microthyrus - (Malaysia to the Philippines)
- O. m. neaera (de Nicéville, 1891) - (Burma, Thailand, Malaysia, Borneo, Sumatra, Banka, Java).
