= Plectocomia microstachys =

Conservation status
- Endangered (IUCN 3.1)

Scientific classification
- Kingdom: Plantae
- Clade: Tracheophytes
- Clade: Angiosperms
- Clade: Monocots
- Clade: Commelinids
- Order: Arecales
- Family: Arecaceae
- Genus: Plectocomia
- Species: P. microstachys

Binomial name
- Plectocomia microstachys Burret

Species of palm

Plectocomia microstachys is a species of flowering plant in the Arecaceae family. It is endemic to China. Its natural habitats are subtropical or tropical moist lowland forests and subtropical or tropical moist montane forests. It is threatened by habitat loss.
