= Plectocomia pierreana =

Scientific classification
- Kingdom: Plantae
- Clade: Tracheophytes
- Clade: Angiosperms
- Clade: Monocots
- Clade: Commelinids
- Order: Arecales
- Family: Arecaceae
- Genus: Plectocomia
- Species: P. pierreana

Binomial name
- Plectocomia pierreana Becc., Webbia; Raccolta de Scritti Botanici. Florence, 3: 236, 1910

Synonyms
- P. barthiana Hodel; P. cambodia Gagnep. ex Lecomte; P. kerriana Beccari.

Species of plant

Plectocomia pierreana is a species of liana in the Arecaceae, or palm tree, family. It is a spiny climber, with either a single stem or a cluster of stems up to 35 m in length, stems are 1 to 9 cm in diameter. Its spines are up to 2 cm long.

The palm is native to Thailand, Cambodia, Laos, Vietnam and China. It occurs in the dense forests and stunted forest of Cambodia, particularly in Kampot and Kampong Chhnang provinces. Growing in Bokor National Park, in Kampot, it occurs in the stunted forest community, called forêt sempervirente basse de montagne by Pauline Dy Phon, that occurs around 920 m, though the plant possibly occurs up to 1014 m. It has also been reported as very common in Phnom Kulen National Park, Siem Reap province, Cambodia, growing particularly in the Evergreen Forest community. In Vietnam it has been identified in Lào Cai, Tuyên Quang and Vĩnh Phúc provinces. Present in Yunnan, Guangxi and Guangdong provinces in China, it is found in lowland to montane rainforests below 1200 m, growing rapidly and abundantly.

In Cambodia, the plant is known as phdau traèhs, phdau ach moën or phdao sno, and the stalk/trunk is used to make ropes and in basketwork. Producing large rattan, between 20 and 40 mm in diameter, out of which furniture, baskets, fish-traps, e.t.c are made, wai teleuk (local name in Lao language, wai means rattan) is commercially exploited in Laos.
