= Calamus ornatus =

Scientific classification
- Kingdom: Plantae
- Clade: Tracheophytes
- Clade: Angiosperms
- Clade: Monocots
- Clade: Commelinids
- Order: Arecales
- Family: Arecaceae
- Genus: Calamus
- Species: C. ornatus

Binomial name
- Calamus ornatus Blume

Synonyms
- Palmijuncus ornatus (Blume) Kuntze; Rotang ornatus (Blume) Baill.; Calamus aureus Reinw. ex Mart.; Palmijuncus aureus (Reinw. ex Mart.) Kuntze; Calamus ornatus var. celebicus Becc.; Calamus ornatus var. horridus Becc.; Calamus ornatus var. mitis Becc.; Calamus ornatus var. philippinensis Becc.; Calamus ornatus var. pulverulentus Fernando; Calamus ornatus var. sumatranus Becc.; Calamus ovatus Reinw. ex Mart.

Species of plant

Calamus ornatus is a species of rattan palm native to peninsular Thailand, west and central Malaysia and the Philippines. It grows as a liana in wet tropical habitats.

== Description ==
Calamus ornatus is a massive, clustering, high-climbing rattan that can reach up to 50 meters in length. It is dioecious, with separate male and female plants. The stem, when it's sheathes are removed, is slightly angular and grows up to 40 mm in diameter, while the sheathed stem can reach 70 mm in diameter. The nodes are prominent, with internodes extending up to 30 cm.

The leaves are large, with a pale to dark green sheath that bears irregularly arranged, upward-pointing black spines with yellowish bases, measuring up to 4 cm long and 1 cm wide. The knee is well-developed, and the ocrea is short and tattered. A massive, dark green whip-like climbing organ extends over 10 meters, armed with short black spines in partial whorls. The petiole is linear, reaching up to 1 meter in length and 4 cm in width, though often smaller. Each side of the rachis holds 20–30 leaflets, with the lower leaflets measuring about 50 cm × 5 cm and the largest, central leaflets growing up to 80 cm × 8 cm. The leaflets decrease in size towards the tip, with the smallest measuring 4 cm × 0.5 cm. The rachis forms a partially developed cirrus, and the upper surfaces of the leaflets are prickly near the tip and along the primary veins.

The inflorescence develops a whip-like climbing organ., reaching up to 8 meters in length and bearing 4–6 partial inflorescences of up to 80 cm. Female inflorescences have robust, reflexed rachillae, while male inflorescences are more branched. The ripe fruit is ellipsoid, measuring 3 cm × 2 cm, with a short beak and covered in 15 vertical rows of yellow-brown to matte black scales, which are slightly lighter at their bases. The seed is ellipsoid (2 cm × 0.8 cm), somewhat angular with grooves on its flattened lateral face, and enclosed in a sour sarcotesta. The endosperm is homogeneous. Seedlings emerge with a bifid, shiny green leaf
