= Calamus tetradactylus =

Scientific classification
- Kingdom: Plantae
- Clade: Tracheophytes
- Clade: Angiosperms
- Clade: Monocots
- Clade: Commelinids
- Order: Arecales
- Family: Arecaceae
- Genus: Calamus
- Species: C. tetradactylus

Binomial name
- Calamus tetradactylus Hance

Synonyms
- Calamus batoensis A.J.Hend. & N.Q.Dung; Calamus bonianus Becc.; Calamus cambojensis Becc.; Calamus crispus A.J.Hend., N.K.Ban & N.Q.Dung; Calamus flavinervis A.J.Hend. & N.Q.Dung; Calamus solitarius T.Evans, Sengdala, Viengkham, Thamm. & J.Dransf.; Calamus tetradactylus var. bonianus (Becc.) Conrard; Palmijuncus tetradactylus (Hance) Kuntze

Species of palm

Calamus tetradactylus is a climbing plant in the Arecaceae, or palm, family, and is part of a subfamily, Calamoideae, whose members are usually called rattans in English. It is native to southeast and east Thailand, Cambodia, Vietnam, south and central Laos, and Yunnan and elsewhere in southeast China. It grows in evergreen forest and scrub between 100 and 1,000m elevation. In Cambodia, it is described as a large and long rattan, its stalk growing from 20 to 70m long, growing in secondary formations near rivers.

The conservation status of this palm is likely to be under very little threat, as the species is widespread, common and widely cultivated, though local sub-taxa/varieties might be under threat.

Vernacular names include: wai krit (Thailand); phdau sa:ng, phdau saèng (Khmer, phdau=rattan, sa:ng/saèng="for two"),; re peu (Alak); wai hangnou, wai hangnounyai, wai savang (Lao Loum); kaceck doikanair (Phong); may (common and commercial name for small diameter rattans), may tat, nep, may ruot ga (Vietnam).

The fruit is eaten in Cambodia, the rattan is much appreciated in basket making, and a traditional medicine decoction of the root is taken for fever.

The cane from this species is of high quality, and probably of trade importance, especially in Vietnam. Vu Van Dung and Le Huy Guang, writing in 1996, argue that this rattan has been cultivated by smallholders around Hanoi for over 100 years, this is argued to be one of the oldest rattan cultivation systems known.

The availability of wild plants of this small diameter rattan was decreasing in the Cẩm Xuyên District, Hà Tĩnh Province, Vietnam. Since 1998, there has been local household garden growing, however while manufacturing of furniture and handicrafts has continued, and the Hanoi market has been tapped into, expansion into international markets has not occurred. Household items manufactured from the split cane in the area include rope, baskets, pillows and seat surfaces.
