= Calamus longisetus =

Scientific classification
- Kingdom: Plantae
- Clade: Tracheophytes
- Clade: Angiosperms
- Clade: Monocots
- Clade: Commelinids
- Order: Arecales
- Family: Arecaceae
- Genus: Calamus
- Species: C. longisetus

Binomial name
- Calamus longisetus Griff.

Species of plant

Calamus longisetus is a rattan liana in the family Arecaceae endemic to the rainforests of the Andaman Islands south of Burma. It is noteworthy for the extreme length of its flagella (spiney, tendril-like extensions of the frond's rachis used in climbing into the forest canopy). According to Henderson, these flagella can be up to 13 m (43 ft) long.
