= Calamus javensis =

Scientific classification
- Kingdom: Plantae
- Clade: Embryophytes
- Clade: Tracheophytes
- Clade: Spermatophytes
- Clade: Angiosperms
- Clade: Monocots
- Clade: Commelinids
- Order: Arecales
- Family: Arecaceae
- Genus: Calamus
- Species: C. javensis

Binomial name
- Calamus javensis Blume

Synonyms
- List: Palmijuncus javensis (Blume); Calamus acuminatus Becc.; Calamus amplectens Becc.; Calamus amplijugus J.Dransf.; Calamus borneensis Miq.; Calamus congestiflorus J.Dransf.; Calamus corrugatus Becc.; Calamus elopurensis J.Dransf.; Calamus equestris Blume; Calamus filiformis Becc.; Calamus fissijugatus Burret; Calamus hypertrichosus Becc.; Calamus impar Becc.; Calamus javensis var. acicularis Becc.; Calamus javensis subvar. exilis Becc.; Calamus javensis var. firmus Blume; Calamus javensis var. inermis (Ridl.) Ridl.; Calamus javensis var. intermedius (Becc.) Becc.; Calamus javensis subvar. intermedius Becc.; Calamus javensis var. laevis Furtado; Calamus javensis subvar. mollispinus Becc.; Calamus javensis var. peninsularis Becc.; Calamus javensis var. pinangianus (Becc.) Ridl.; Calamus javensis subvar. pinangianus Becc.; Calamus javensis var. polyphyllus (Becc.) Becc.; Calamus javensis subvar. polyphyllus Becc.; Calamus javensis var. purpurascens (Ridl.) Ridl.; Calamus javensis subvar. purpurascens Becc.; Calamus javensis var. sublaevis Becc.; Calamus javensis var. tenuissimus (Becc.) Becc.; Calamus javensis subvar. tenuissimus Becc.; Calamus javensis var. tetrastichus Blume; Calamus kemamanensis Furtado; Calamus penicillatus var. inermis Ridl.; Calamus penicillatus var. pinangianus (Becc.) Ridl.; Calamus penicillatus var. purpurascens Ridl.; Calamus tetrastichus Blume; Palmijuncus amplectens (Becc.); Palmijuncus borneensis (Miq.); Palmijuncus tetrastichus (Blume)

Species of plant

Calamus javensis is a vine in the family Arecaceae. It is native to the East Indies. The species is the thinnest of all rattans, measuring only 3 mm in width.
