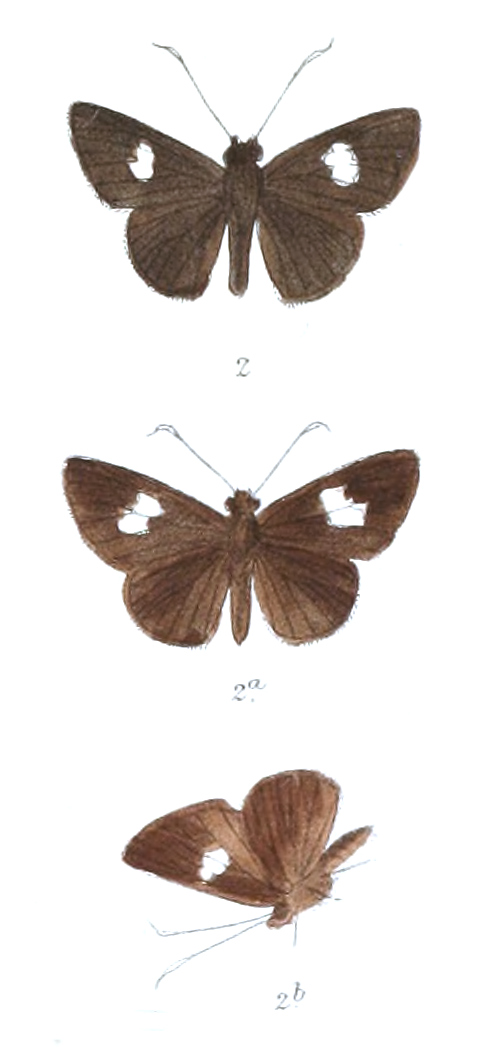

Scientific classification
- Kingdom: Animalia
- Phylum: Arthropoda
- Class: Insecta
- Order: Lepidoptera
- Family: Hesperiidae
- Subfamily: Hesperiinae
- Tribe: Erionotini
- Genus: Oerane; Elwes & Edwards, 1897

Synonyms
- Pemara Eliot, 1978

= Oerane =

Genus of butterflies

Oerane is a genus of butterflies in the family Hesperiidae. Species of the genus are found in the Indomalayan realm.

== Species ==
- Oerane microthyrus Mabille, 1883 - Burma, Thailand, Malaysia, Borneo, Sumatra, Banka, Java and the Philippines
- Oerane pugnans (de Nicéville, 1891) - Indomalayan realm
