= Calamus viminalis =

Scientific classification
- Kingdom: Plantae
- Clade: Embryophytes
- Clade: Tracheophytes
- Clade: Spermatophytes
- Clade: Angiosperms
- Clade: Monocots
- Clade: Commelinids
- Order: Arecales
- Family: Arecaceae
- Genus: Calamus
- Species: C. viminalis

Binomial name
- Calamus viminalis Willd., Sp. Pl., ed. 4 2(1): 203 (1799)

Synonyms
- Calamus buroensis Mart. ex Walp.; C. extensus Mart.; C. fasciculatus Roxb.; C. fasciculatus subvar. andamanicus Becc.; C. fasciculatus subvar. bengalensis Becc.; C. fasciculatus subvar. cochinchinensis Becc.; C. fasciculatus subvar. pinangianus Becc.; C. litoralis Blume; C. phuocbinhensis A.J.Hend. & N.Q.Dung; C. pseudorotang Mart.; C. siamensis Becc.; C. siamensis var. malaianus Furtado; C. viminalis var. fasciculatus (Roxb.) Becc.; Palmijuncus fasciculatus (Roxb.) Kuntze; P. litoralis (Blume) Kuntze; P. pseudorotang (Mart.) Kuntze; P. viminalis (Willd.) Kuntze; Rotang viminalis (Willd.) Baill.

Species of palm

Calamus viminalis, one of many Calamus species commonly referred to as rattan, is a plant of the Arecaceae, or palm, family native to: Java and Bali in Indonesia; Peninsular Malaysia; all parts of Thailand; Cambodia; Cochinchina and Central Annam in Vietnam; all parts of Laos; Myanmar; Bangladesh; Andaman and Nicobar Islands; North-east, North-central, and South India; and probably north-west and south Yunnan in China.

The plant grows with clustered stems, either climbing on other plants or forming thickets. The stems can reach 35m with a diameter up to 4 cm. The whitish or yellowish globose fruit, up to 1 cm in diam., are sometimes borne in pairs. In Tripura state, India, the palm flowers and fruits from November to January.

It grows at village margins and in scrub, forest edge and (locally) inside evergreen forest, from 0-600m elevation. In Cambodia it occurs in semi-dense forests and at the rear of mangrove formations.

As the palm is favoured by forest loss and tolerates harvesting well, it is of no conservation concern.

Vernacular names include: Thai, wai ngamkhao, wai namhang, wai sambai, wai mon, wai som, wai dong; Khmer phdau kraek (phdau=rattan), phdao chhvaing krek; Hmong, katengparua; Alak, rebou; Lao, wai ton, wai nyair, wai na, wai khom, wai namhang, wai keethao, wai nang, wai tiudeet, wai namleuang; Khamu, blong chang; Andaman Islands dudh beth (beth is common to rattans); in Tripura state, India, bet gota, rigorusam; in Songhason Hills, Assam, pri; Chinese 柳条省藤 liu tiao sheng teng.

The rattan or cane is of moderate quality, and is used in many places for handicrafts and sometimes traded. In Cambodia it is described as being used to make rough baskets, ropes and canes. Villages in Kampong Chhnang, Mondulkiri and Ratanakiri provinces in Cambodia grow this palm in plantations, and use the stems for making furnishings, it is regarded as having medium market value and conservation value.

The shoot of the germinating plant is edible, in Southeast Asia they are about 1m long when harvested, and sold in bundles with the leaf sheaths in place, if the sheaths are removed the shoot must be cooked immediately, otherwise they can remain fresh for a week. The fruit is sometimes sold for food. In the Andaman Islands, the stem is not used for commercial purposes, though may be used for domestic items, it is regarded as easily breakable, but the fruit is eaten. Amongst forest-dwelling people of Tripura state, India, the sour-tasting ripe fruit is eaten with salt and chili. In the Songhason Hills of Karbi Anglong District of Assam the fruit and shoots are used as food while the stems are used for construction and craft, it is suggested that the plant has potential for horticultural production.
