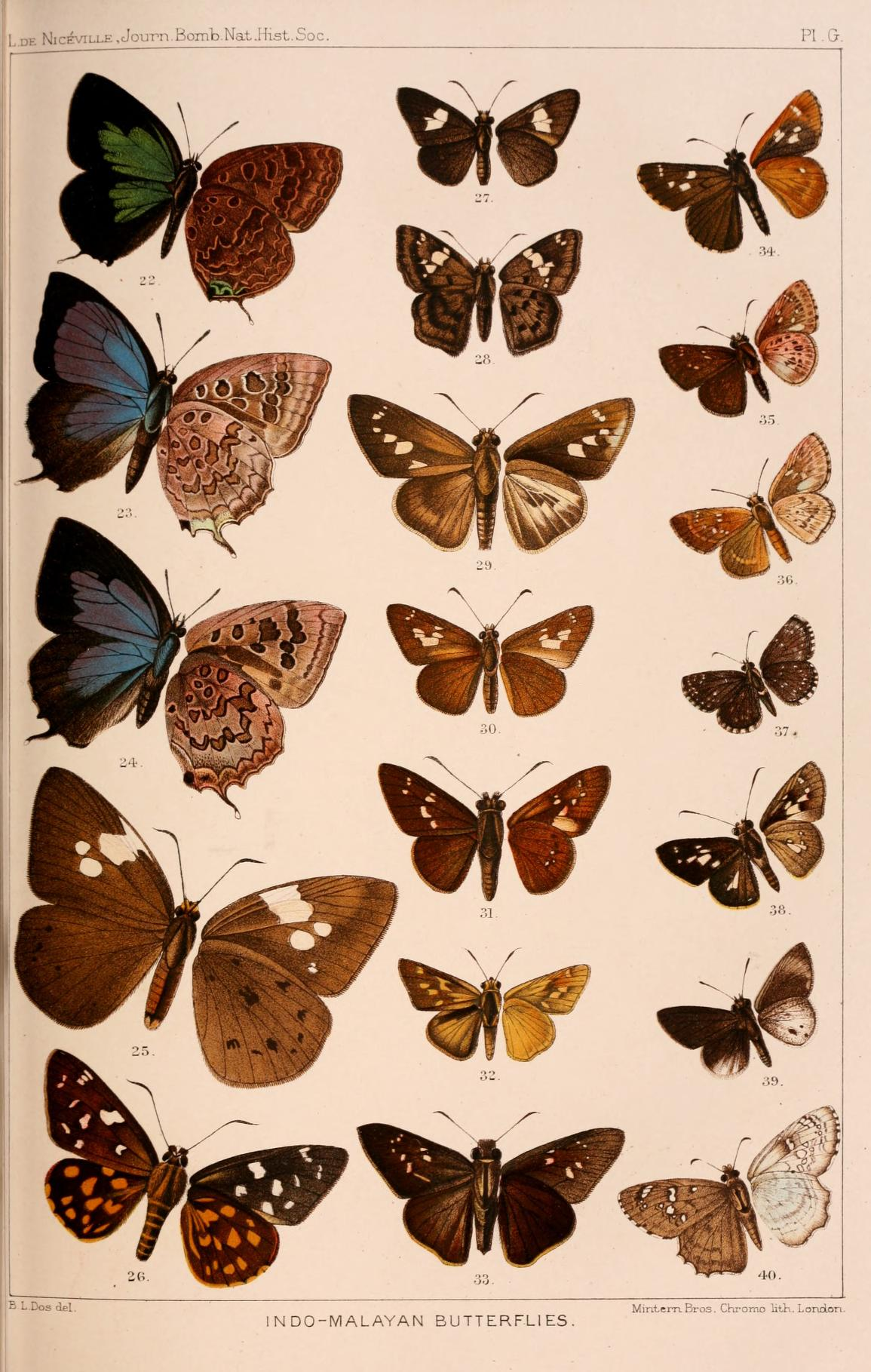
- Figure 30 in Lionel de Nicéville's 1891 "On New and Little-Known Butterflies from the Indo-Malayan Region"

Scientific classification
- Kingdom: Animalia
- Phylum: Arthropoda
- Clade: Pancrustacea
- Class: Insecta
- Order: Lepidoptera
- Family: Hesperiidae
- Genus: Oerane
- Species: O. pugnans

Binomial name
- Oerane pugnans (de Nicéville, [1890])

Synonyms
- Elwes and Edwards, 1897: Parnara pugnans de Nicéville, 1891; Pemara pugnans (de Nicéville, 1891)

= Oerane pugnans =

Species of butterfly

Oerane pugnans, the pugnacious lancer, is a species of butterfly in the family Hesperiidae. It was described by Lionel de Nicéville in 1891. It is found in the Indomalayan realm (Burma, Thailand, Malaysia, Singapore, Borneo, Sumatra, Siberut, Nias, Bangka and Java).The ground colour is brown or yellow brown' The small spots of the forewing are hyaline. The lower cellular spot is situate at the lower cell-wall, and below it there is a rather large, almost rectangular transverse spot. The hindwing is on both sides spotless dark brown, but above the hair in the proximal portion of the wing is somewhat lighter glossy.
