= Calamus ingens =

Scientific classification
- Kingdom: Plantae
- Clade: Tracheophytes
- Clade: Angiosperms
- Clade: Monocots
- Clade: Commelinids
- Order: Arecales
- Family: Arecaceae
- Subfamily: Calamoideae
- Tribe: Calameae
- Genus: Calamus
- Species: C. ingens

Binomial name
- Calamus ingens (J.Dransf.) W.J.Baker

Genus of palms

Calamus ingens is a species of plant with a rosette growth form in the palm family Arecaceae. It is endemic to Mulu National Park, in Sarawak, Borneo. A liana, it has as subterranean stem that is up to 0.5 m (20 in) long and 120 mm (4.7 in) thick. From this spring up pinnate fronds up to 6 m (20 ft) long armed with spines up to 110 mm (4.3 in) in length.
