= Calamus inermis =

Conservation status
- Least Concern (IUCN 3.1)

Scientific classification
- Kingdom: Plantae
- Clade: Tracheophytes
- Clade: Angiosperms
- Clade: Monocots
- Clade: Commelinids
- Order: Arecales
- Family: Arecaceae
- Genus: Calamus
- Species: C. inermis

Binomial name
- Calamus inermis T.Anderson

Synonyms
- List: Calamus banlingensis Cheng Y.Yang, Zheng H.Yang & J.Lu; Calamus distichus var. shangsiensis S.J.Pei & S.Y.Chen; Calamus doriaei Becc.; Calamus giganteus var. robustus S.J.Pei & S.Y.Chen; Calamus inermis var. menghaiensis San Y.Chen, S.J.Pei & K.L.Wang; Calamus khasianus Becc.; Calamus multinervis var. menglaensis San Y.Chen, S.J.Pei & K.L.Wang; Calamus nambariensis var. alpinus S.J.Pei & S.Y.Chen; Calamus nambariensis var. furfuraceus S.J.Pei & S.Y.Chen; Calamus nambariensis var. menglongensis S.J.Pei & S.Y.Chen; Calamus nambariensis var. xishuangbannaensis S.J.Pei & S.Y.Chen; Calamus nambariensis var. yingjiangensis S.J.Pei & S.Y.Chen; Calamus obovoideus S.J.Pei & S.Y.Chen; Calamus palustris var. longistachys S.J.Pei & S.Y.Chen; Calamus platyacanthoides Merr.; Calamus platyacanthus Warb. ex Becc.; Calamus platyacanthus var. longicarpus San Y.Chen & K.L.Wang; Calamus platyacanthus var. mediostachys S.J.Pei & S.Y.Chen; Calamus polydesmus Becc.; Calamus simplicifolius C.F.Wei; Calamus wailong S.J.Pei & S.Y.Chen; Palmijuncus inermis (T.Anderson) Kuntze

Species of plant

Calamus inermis (synonym C. wailong) is a species of flowering plant in the family Arecaceae. It is a liana native to Indochina (Laos, Myanmar, Thailand, and Vietnam), Yunnan and Hainan in China, northeastern India, and Bangladesh. Its natural habitat is subtropical or tropical seasonal forests. It is threatened by habitat loss.

The species was first described by Thomas Anderson in 1869.
