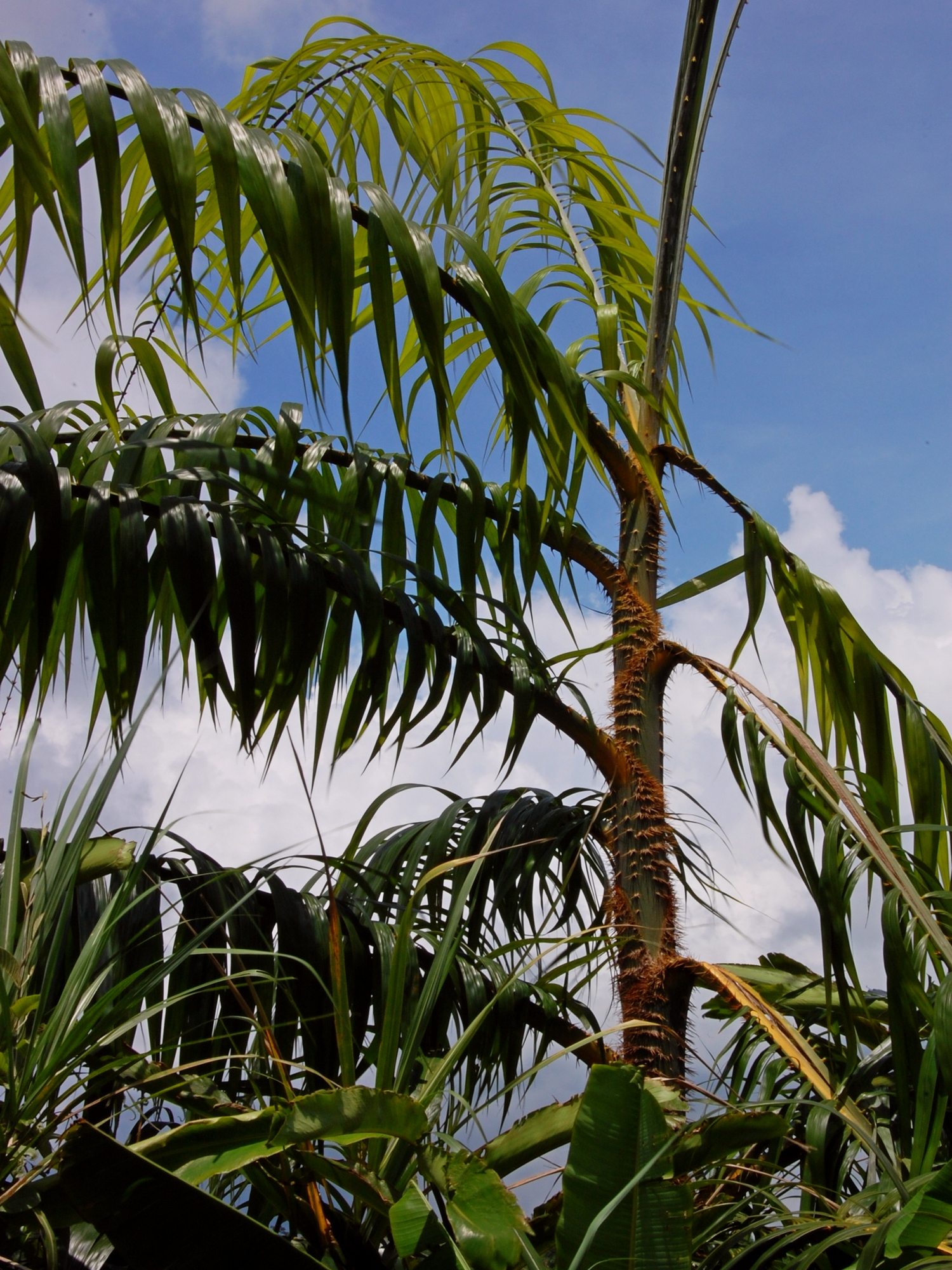
- Plectocomia elongata

Scientific classification
- Kingdom: Plantae
- Clade: Tracheophytes
- Clade: Angiosperms
- Clade: Monocots
- Clade: Commelinids
- Order: Arecales
- Family: Arecaceae
- Subfamily: Calamoideae
- Tribe: Calameae
- Genus: Plectocomia; Mart. & Blume

= Plectocomia =

Genus of plants

Plectocomia is a genus of flowering plant in the family Arecaceae native to China, the Himalayas, and Southeast Asia. Plants are dioecious, with male and female flowers produced on separate individuals.

== Species ==
The genus contains the following known species:

- Plectocomia assamica Griff. - Bhutan, Assam, Arunachal Pradesh, Yunnan, Myanmar
- Plectocomia billitonensis Becc. - Belitung
- Plectocomia bractealis Becc. - Assam
- Plectocomia dransfieldiana Madulid - Perak
- Plectocomia elmeri Becc. - Palawan, Mindanao
- Plectocomia elongata Mart. ex Blume - Indochina, Borneo, Java, Sumatra, Philippines
  (synonym P. khasyana Griff. - Assam)
- Plectocomia himalayana Griff. - Nepal, Sikkim, Bhutan, Assam, Arunachal Pradesh, Yunnan, Laos, Thailand
- Plectocomia longistigma Madulid - Java
- Plectocomia lorzingii Madulid - Sumatra
- Plectocomia macrostachya Kurz - Myanmar
- Plectocomia microstachys Burret - Hainan
- Plectocomia mulleri Blume - Borneo, Malaysia
- Plectocomia pierreana Becc. - Vietnam, Cambodia, Laos, Thailand, Guangdong, Guangxi, Yunnan
- Plectocomia pygmaea Madulid - Kalimantan

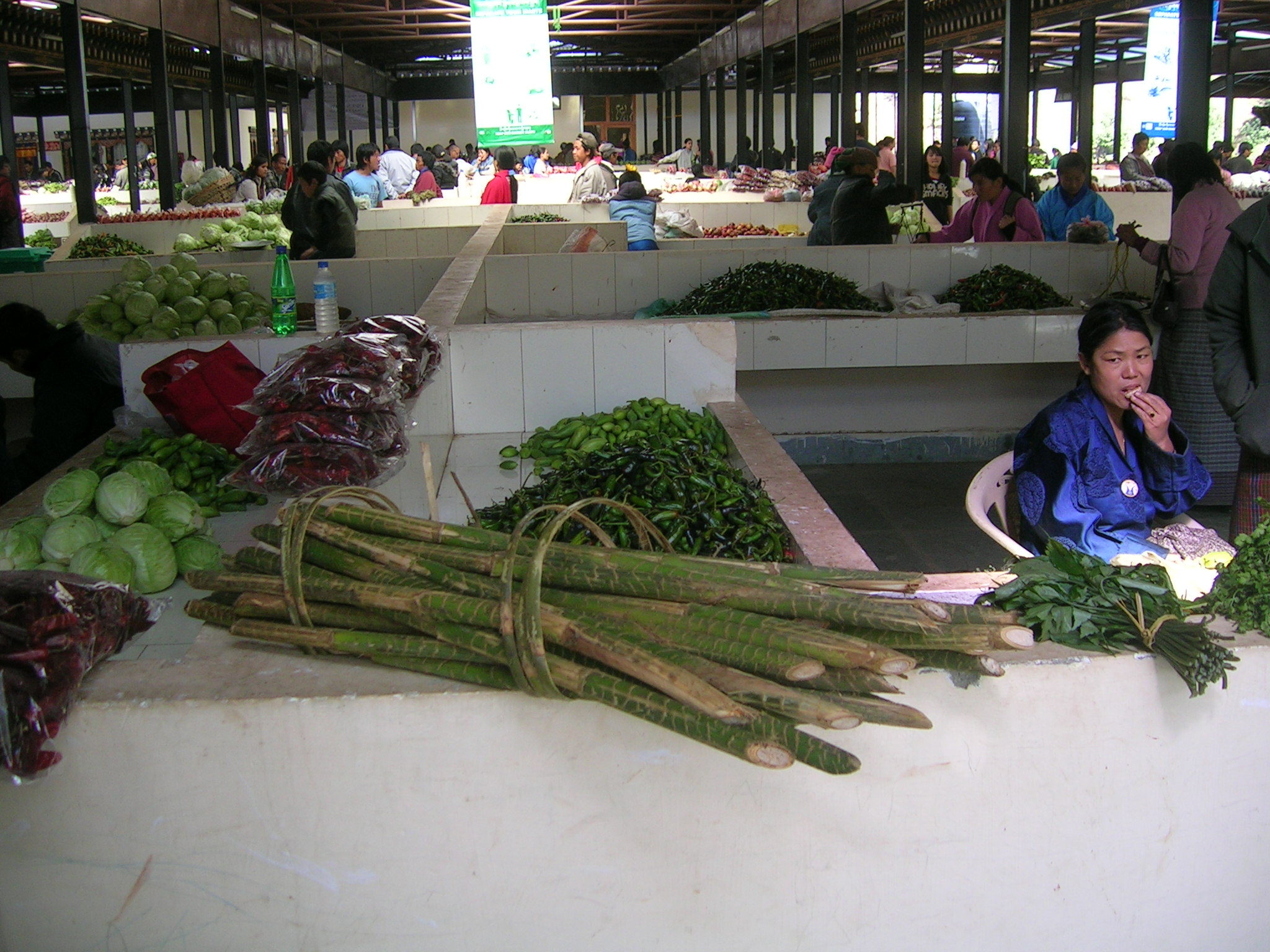
P. himalayana stems are cooked and eaten as a vegetable in Bhutan
