= Calamus nambariensis =

Conservation status
- Critically Endangered (IUCN 3.1)

Scientific classification
- Kingdom: Plantae
- Clade: Tracheophytes
- Clade: Angiosperms
- Clade: Monocots
- Clade: Commelinids
- Order: Arecales
- Family: Arecaceae
- Genus: Calamus
- Species: C. nambariensis

Binomial name
- Calamus nambariensis Becc.

Synonyms
- Calamus banlingensis Cheng Y. Yang, Zheng H. Yang & J.Lu; Calamus doriaei Becc.; Calamus giganteus var. robustus S.J.Pei & S.Y.Chen; Calamus inermis T.Anderson; Calamus inermis var. menghaiensis San Y.Chen, S.J.Pei & K.L.Wang; Calamus khasianus Becc.; Calamus multinervis var. menglaensis San Y.Chen, S.J.Pei & K.L.Wang; Calamus nambariensis var. alpinus S.J.Pei & S.Y.Chen; Calamus nambariensis var. furfuraceus S.J.Pei & S.Y.Chen; Calamus nambariensis var. menglongensis S.J.Pei & S.Y.Chen; Calamus nambariensis var. xishuangbannaensis S.J.Pei & S.Y.Chen; Calamus nambariensis var. yingjiangensis S.J.Pei & S.Y.Chen; Calamus obovoideus S.J.Pei & S.Y.Chen; Calamus palustris var. longistachys S.J.Pei & S.Y.Chen; Calamus platyacanthoides Merr.; Calamus platyacanthus Warb. ex Becc.; Calamus platyacanthus var. longicarpus San Y.Chen & K.L.Wang; Calamus platyacanthus var. mediostachys S.J.Pei & S.Y.Chen; Calamus polydesmus Becc.; Calamus wailong S.J.Pei & S.Y.Chen; Palmijuncus inermis (T.Anderson) Kuntze

Species of plant

Calamus nambariensis is a species of flowering plant in the family Arecaceae. It is found in Burma, Laos, Vietnam, Thailand, Nepal, Bhutan, Bangladesh, the Assam region of India and the Yunnan region of China.

The natural habitat of Calamus nambariensis is subtropical or tropical moist lowland forests. It is threatened by habitat loss.
