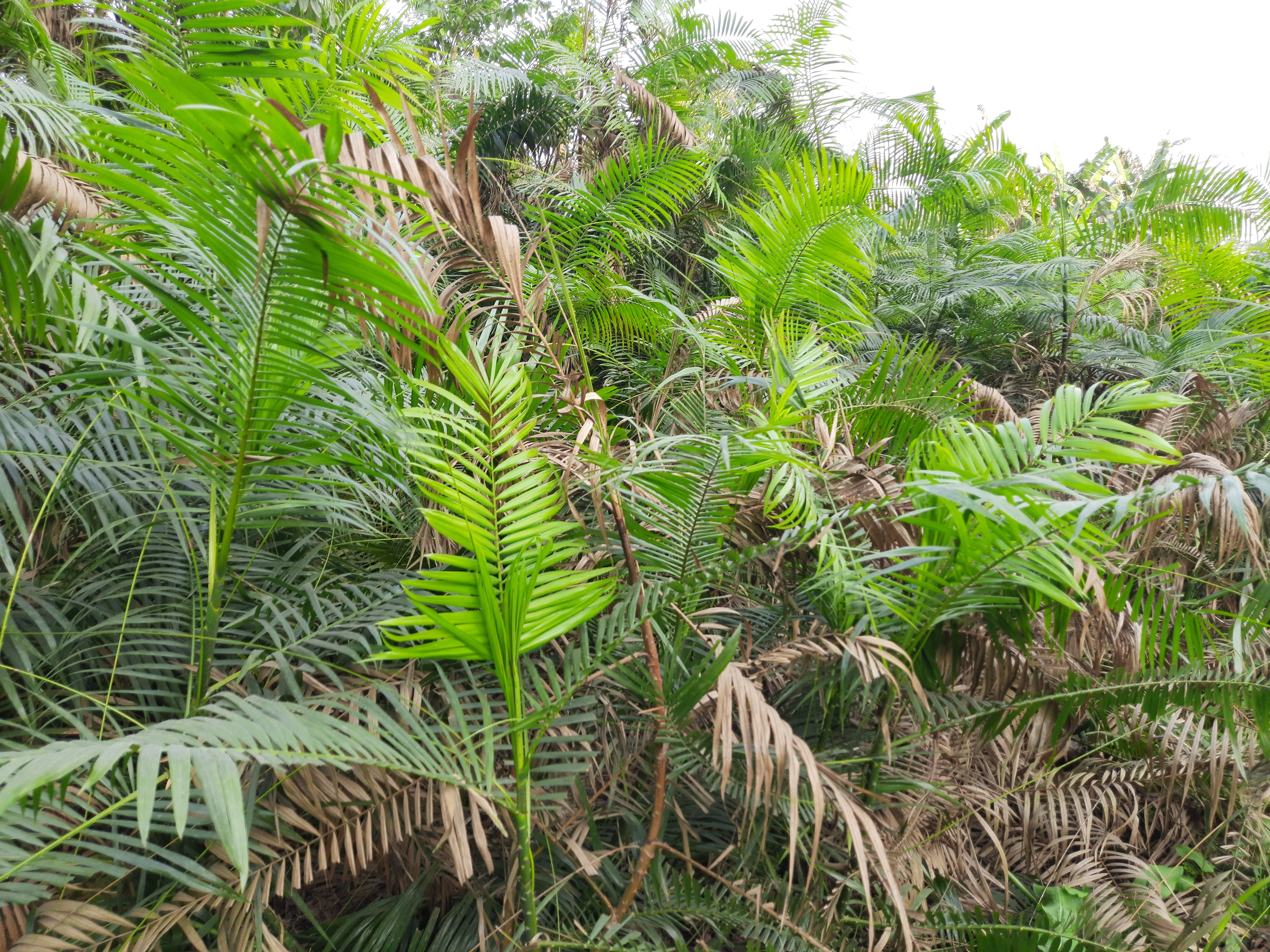
- In Bangladesh

Conservation status
- Least Concern (IUCN 3.1)

Scientific classification
- Kingdom: Plantae
- Clade: Tracheophytes
- Clade: Angiosperms
- Clade: Monocots
- Clade: Commelinids
- Order: Arecales
- Family: Arecaceae
- Genus: Calamus
- Species: C. tenuis

Binomial name
- Calamus tenuis Roxb.

Synonyms
- Palmijuncus tenuis (Roxb.) Kuntze; Calamus amarus Lour.; Calamus delessertianus Becc.; Calamus heliotropium Buch.-Ham. ex Mart.; Calamus royleanus Griff.; Palmijuncus amarus (Lour.) Kuntze; Palmijuncus heliotropium (Buch.-Ham. ex Mart.) Kuntze; Palmijuncus royleanus (Griff.) Kuntze; Rotang royleanus (Griff.) Baill.

= Calamus tenuis =

Species of palm

Calamus tenuis is a species of flowering plant in the family Arecaceae. It is native to Bangladesh, Bhutan, Cambodia, India, Laos, Myanmar, Thailand, Vietnam, Java and Sumatra.

Its natural habitats are subtropical or tropical moist lowland forests and subtropical or tropical moist montane forests. It is threatened by habitat loss.
