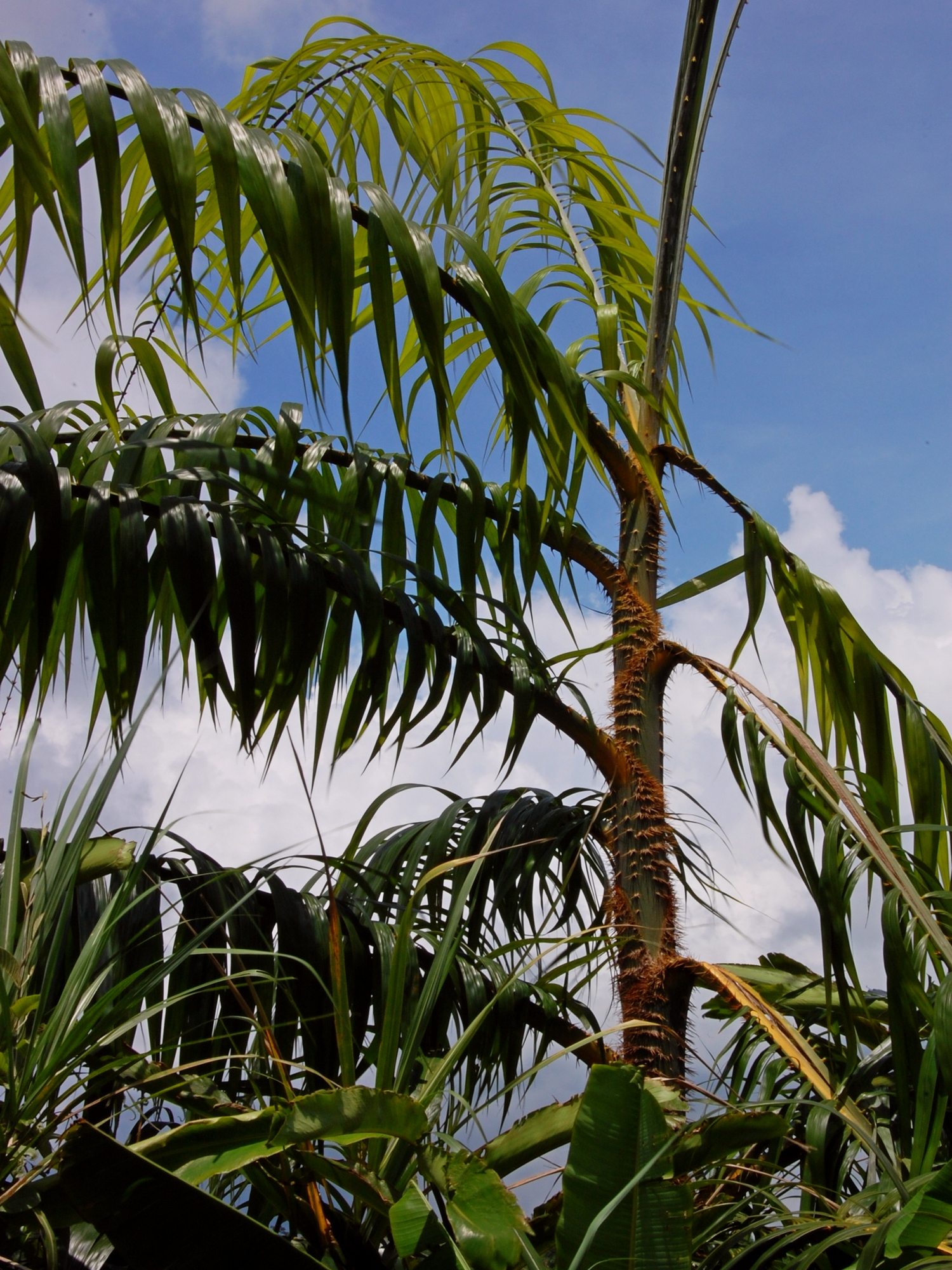

Scientific classification
- Kingdom: Plantae
- Clade: Tracheophytes
- Clade: Angiosperms
- Clade: Monocots
- Clade: Commelinids
- Order: Arecales
- Family: Arecaceae
- Genus: Plectocomia
- Species: P. elongata

Binomial name
- Plectocomia elongata Mart. ex Blume

Synonyms
- Rotang maximus Baill.

= Plectocomia elongata =

Species of palm

Plectocomia elongata is a species of plant in the family Arecaceae. It is native to Assam, India, Borneo, Cambodia, Java, Peninsular Malaysia, Myanmar, Philippines, Sumatra, Thailand, and Vietnam.

== Varieties ==
Plants of the World Online includes:

1. P. elongata var. elongata; synonyms:
  1. Calamus maximus Reinw. ex Schult.f.
  2. Plectocomia crinita L.Gentil ex Chitt.
  3. P. elongata var. bangkana Becc.
  4. P. griffithii Becc.
  5. P. hystrix Schaedtler (tentative)
  6. P. icthyospinus T.Moore & Mast.
  7. P. khasyana Griff.
  8. P. maxima Kuntze
  9. P. sumatrana Miq.
2. P. elongata var. philippinensis Madulid
