= Calamus egregius =

Conservation status
- Vulnerable (IUCN 3.1)

Scientific classification
- Kingdom: Plantae
- Clade: Tracheophytes
- Clade: Angiosperms
- Clade: Monocots
- Clade: Commelinids
- Order: Arecales
- Family: Arecaceae
- Genus: Calamus
- Species: C. egregius

Binomial name
- Calamus egregius Burret

Species of palm

Calamus egregius is a species of flowering plant in the family Arecaceae. It is found only in the Hainan region of China. Its natural habitats are subtropical or tropical moist lowland forests and subtropical or tropical moist montane forests.

Calamus egregius is threatened by habitat loss.
