= Calamus oblongus =

Scientific classification
- Kingdom: Plantae
- Clade: Tracheophytes
- Clade: Angiosperms
- Clade: Monocots
- Clade: Commelinids
- Order: Arecales
- Family: Arecaceae
- Genus: Calamus
- Species: C. oblongus

Binomial name
- Calamus oblongus Reinw. ex Blume

Species of plant

Calamus oblongus is a species of plant in the family Arecaceae.
