= Ceratispa metallica =

Scientific classification
- Kingdom: Animalia
- Phylum: Arthropoda
- Clade: Pancrustacea
- Class: Insecta
- Order: Coleoptera
- Suborder: Polyphaga
- Infraorder: Cucujiformia
- Family: Chrysomelidae
- Genus: Ceratispa
- Species: C. metallica

Binomial name
- Ceratispa metallica (Gestro, 1885)

Synonyms
- Oxycephala metallica Gestro, 1885; Ceratispa (Metallispa) metallica purpurea Gressitt, 1963

Species of beetle

Ceratispa metallica is a species of beetle of the family Chrysomelidae. It is found in eastern New Guinea.

== Description ==
Adults reach a length of about 9.6-11.6 mm. They are metallic green to purplish above. The elytra are red to purplish, with some greenish near the base and reddish purplish near the apex.

== Life history ==
The recorded host plants for this species are rattan, Calamus, Daemonorops and Korthalsia species. The immature stages take place between the petiole bases and the main stems of the host plant. Adults feed on the undersides of the newest fronds. The larvae reach a length of about 10 mm.
