= Aspidispa papuana =

Scientific classification
- Kingdom: Animalia
- Phylum: Arthropoda
- Class: Insecta
- Order: Coleoptera
- Suborder: Polyphaga
- Infraorder: Cucujiformia
- Family: Chrysomelidae
- Genus: Aspidispa
- Species: A. papuana

Binomial name
- Aspidispa papuana Gressitt, 1963

Species of beetle

Aspidispa papuana is a species of beetle of the family Chrysomelidae. It is found in south-eastern New Guinea.

== Description ==
Adults reach a length of about 3.3 mm. They are pitchy brown to pale brown or ochraceous.

== Life history ==
The recorded host plants for this species are Calamus and Daemonorops species.
