= Aspidispa calami =

Scientific classification
- Kingdom: Animalia
- Phylum: Arthropoda
- Class: Insecta
- Order: Coleoptera
- Suborder: Polyphaga
- Infraorder: Cucujiformia
- Family: Chrysomelidae
- Genus: Aspidispa
- Species: A. calami

Binomial name
- Aspidispa calami Gressitt, 1963

Species of beetle

Aspidispa calami is a species of beetle of the family Chrysomelidae. It is found in New Guinea. This small beetle feeds exclusively on rattan palms (Calamus species) in its native habitat. Adults are typically 3–4 millimetres long with distinctive dark wing covers marked by pale stripes.

== Taxonomy ==
Aspidispa calami was described as a new species in 1963 by Judson Linsley Gressitt. The holotype specimen (BISHOP 3521) is from Brown River, near Port Moresby, Papua New Guinea, at 10 m elevation; it was collected on 5 October 1958 by Gressitt on a large-leaved Calamus (rattan palm). Two paratypes, also in the Bernice P. Bishop Museum, were taken at Oriomo Government Station on the Oriomo River near Daru on 28 October 1960, likewise by Gressitt on Calamus.

== Description ==
Adults are small leaf-beetles about 3.4–3.6 mm long and roughly 1.2–1.8 mm wide. The upper surface is mostly very dark (described as "pitchy black"), while the underside and legs are yellowish-brown ("testaceous"). The pronotum (the plate immediately behind the head) is usually pale ochre-brown, often with slightly darker edges; the tiny triangular scutellum between the wing bases is ochre with a darkened tip. The hardened forewings (elytra) are chiefly black, but the extreme base and much of the second longitudinal ridge are pale testaceous, giving a two-toned look. Some variation occurs: the pronotum can be entirely pale, and the first elytral ridge may be brown with a paler middle. The legs are testaceous, with the "feet" (tarsi) and tips of the femora and tibiae tinged reddish to dark.

The head is a little over three-quarters the width of the prothorax and bears fine punctures (minute impressed pits) to the sides and a short central groove in front of the eyes. The "forehead" area (frons) is twice as wide as long and gently convex. The short snout-like front of the head (rostrum) is only about one-fifth the length of the first antennal segment (scape). The antennae are fairly stout and about three-fifths the body length; the first two segments are short and cylindrical, the third is longer (about one-and-a-half times the second), segments 4–10 are similar to one another and gradually thicker, and the terminal segment is slightly longer than the third. The pronotum is a little more than twice as wide as long, evenly convex with finely toothed sides and its greatest width placed well before the middle. Its disc has a narrow smooth midline and irregular punctures toward the sides, with the front and rear swellings largely smooth. The scutellum is narrowed and slightly raised behind, with a rounded tip. The elytra are almost parallel-sided and only weakly convex across the middle; their tips are obliquely rounded with very small teeth. The raised longitudinal ridges (costae) on the elytral disc are prominent, except for a shallow depression just beyond the base on the third ridge. The underside is finely punctured at the sides. The legs are relatively small, and the tarsi are not broad. This species differs from A. meijerei in having the sides of the pronotum more evenly convex and the second elytral ridge largely pale.

The larva is elongate, about 5.8 mm long and 1.4 mm wide, pale whitish-testaceous overall. The head capsule is ochre coloured (darker in front, paler behind), about 1.6 times as long as its anterior width and widening toward the rear; its hind margin is triangularly notched. The pronotum is granulose in front and finer behind, with a delicate mid-groove; the remaining dorsal plates are finely net-textured (microreticulate) and each bears a transverse granular band. Each body segment has a slightly oblique, compressed lobe on the side set behind the breathing pore (spiracle), and the last segment is distinctly rounded in the middle.

== Life history ==
The recorded host plants for this species are Calamus species.
