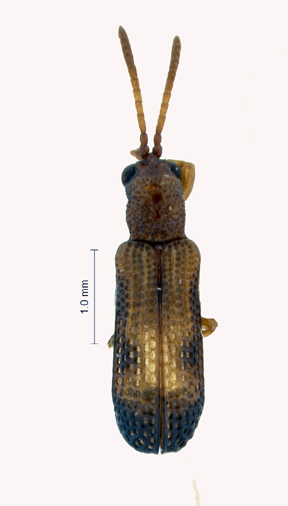

Scientific classification
- Kingdom: Animalia
- Phylum: Arthropoda
- Clade: Pancrustacea
- Class: Insecta
- Order: Coleoptera
- Suborder: Polyphaga
- Infraorder: Cucujiformia
- Family: Chrysomelidae
- Genus: Enischnispa
- Species: E. calamivora

Binomial name
- Enischnispa calamivora Gressitt, 1957

= Enischnispa calamivora =

Species of beetle

Enischnispa calamivora is a species of beetle of the family Chrysomelidae. It is found in Papua New Guinea and the Bismarck Archipelago.

== Description ==
Adults reach a length of about 2.85-3.15 mm. Adults are dark fuscous to piceous, while the elytron is ochraceous along the inner disc, with a postmedian dark band invading the ochraceous area. The antennae are reddish fuscous, while the legs are reddish fuscous to piceous.

== Biology ==
The recorded food plants are Calamus and Daemonorops species.

== Subspecies ==
- Enischnispa calamivora calamivora (Bismarck Archipelago: New Ireland)
- Eniscbnispa calamivora papuana Samuelson, 1990 (Papua New Guinea)
