= Aspidispa korthalsiae =

Scientific classification
- Kingdom: Animalia
- Phylum: Arthropoda
- Class: Insecta
- Order: Coleoptera
- Suborder: Polyphaga
- Infraorder: Cucujiformia
- Family: Chrysomelidae
- Genus: Aspidispa
- Species: A. korthalsiae

Binomial name
- Aspidispa korthalsiae Gressitt, 1963

Species of beetle

Aspidispa korthalsiae is a species of beetle of the family Chrysomelidae. It is found in north-eastern and north-western New Guinea.

== Description ==
Adults reach a length of about 3.2–4.2 mm. They are testaceous to purplish black, while the pronotum is black with a pitchy purplish tinge. The elytra are bluish black with purplish and pitchy tinges.

== Life history ==
The recorded host plants for this species are Calamus and Korthalsia species. The larvae have also been described, they are whitish testaceous, but pale ochraceous on their head and pronotum. The borders, sutures and anterior portion of the head are reddish pitchy.
