= Ceratispa latirostris =

Scientific classification
- Kingdom: Animalia
- Phylum: Arthropoda
- Clade: Pancrustacea
- Class: Insecta
- Order: Coleoptera
- Suborder: Polyphaga
- Infraorder: Cucujiformia
- Family: Chrysomelidae
- Genus: Ceratispa
- Species: C. latirostris

Binomial name
- Ceratispa latirostris (Gestro, 1885)

Synonyms
- Oxycephala latirostris Gestro, 1885; Oxycephala albertisii Gestro, 1885; Oxycephala obtusirostris Gestro, 1898; Oxycephala carinaerostris Csiki, 1900; Xiphispa brunnea Uhmann, 1927

Species of beetle

Ceratispa latirostris is a species of beetle of the family Chrysomelidae. It is found in eastern and northern New Guinea.

== Life history ==
The recorded host plants for this species are Calamus and Daemonorops species, as well as Korthalsia beccarii.
