= Enischnispa rattana =

Scientific classification
- Kingdom: Animalia
- Phylum: Arthropoda
- Clade: Pancrustacea
- Class: Insecta
- Order: Coleoptera
- Suborder: Polyphaga
- Infraorder: Cucujiformia
- Family: Chrysomelidae
- Genus: Enischnispa
- Species: E. rattana

Binomial name
- Enischnispa rattana Gressitt, 1960

Species of beetle

Enischnispa rattana is a species of beetle of the family Chrysomelidae. It is found in north-eastern New Guinea.

== Description ==
Adults reach a length of about 3.5-4.25 mm. They are shiny black above with a slight pitchy reddish tinge.

== Biology ==
The recorded food plants are Calamus and Daemonorops species.
