= Ceratolobus =

Former genus of palms

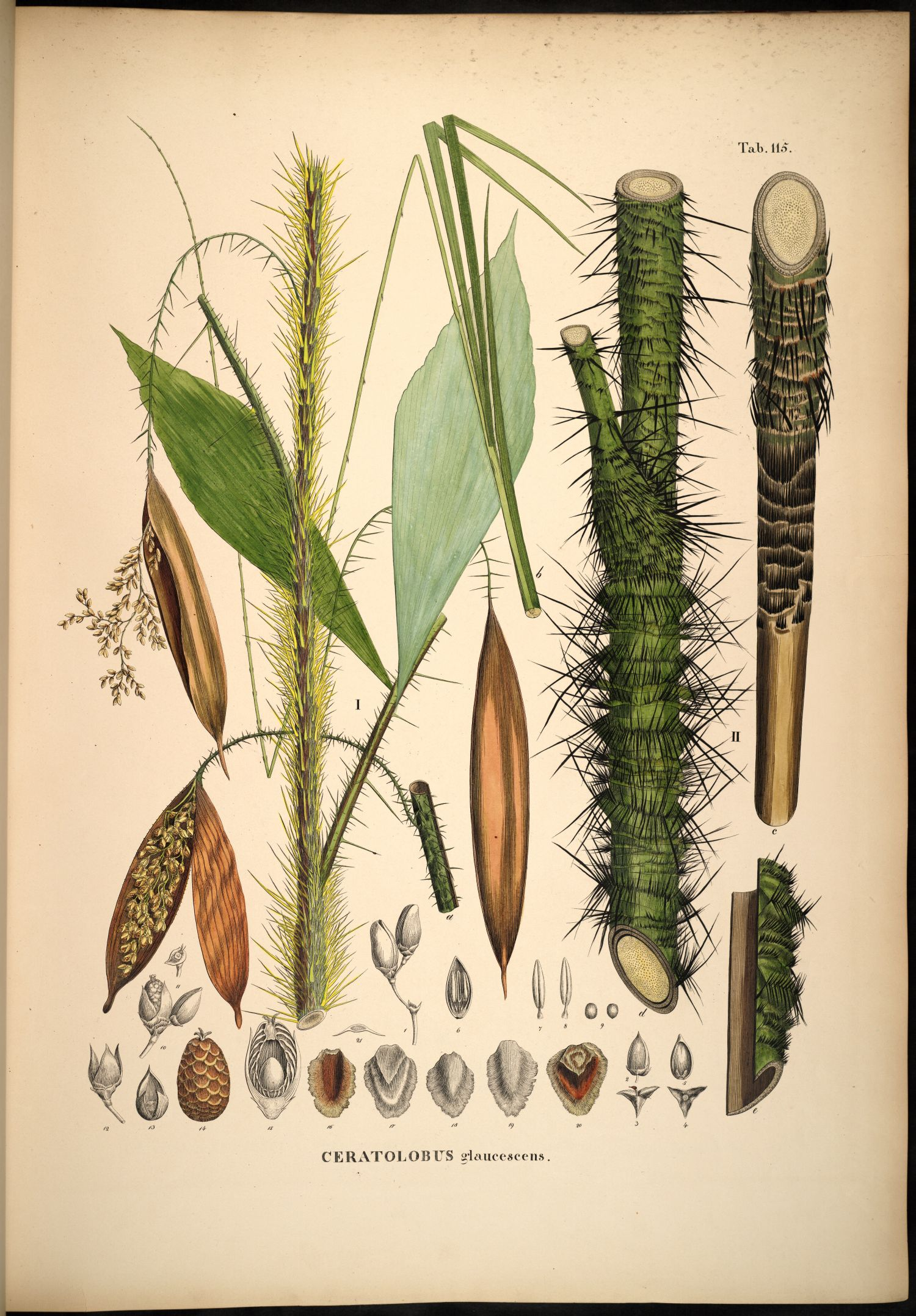
Calamus glaucescens, formerly Ceratolobus glaucescens

Ceratolobus was a dioecious genus of flowering plants in the palm family found in Southeast Asia, commonly called rotan. Its species are now included within the genus Calamus. They were only differentiated from Calamus and close relatives like Korthalsia by leaf sheath appendages or inflorescence variations. The Greek genus name combines "horn" and "capsule".

== Description ==
When the genus Ceratolobus was distinguished from Calamus, its species were described as relatively delicate and vinelike smong rattans, very spiny and densely clustering, the stems eventually becoming bare and covered in leaf scars. The leaves, rachises, and petioles (when present) may be equipped with simple climbing adaptations like barbs, cirrus, and grapnel spines but the climbing habit mostly relies on stem spines, and their leaning, sprawling nature.

With the most reduced inflorescence in the Calaminae, the large panicle remains enclosed within a tough, woody, occasionally armed bract. Nearing antithesis the beaked end develops splits, exposing the flowers; the bract usually remains persistent, later developing another longitudinal split in fruit, or rarely falling away. Pistillate and staminate members are indistinguishable without opening the protective prophyll. The former is branched to two orders, the latter to three; male flowers are borne distant and solitary, female's are larger and develop next to similar, but distorted, sterile male flowers. The globose or egg-shaped fruit is scaly and has one seed.

== Some former species ==
Species formerly placed in Ceratolobus include:

- Ceratolobus concolor Blume → Calamus concolor (Blume) W.J.Baker
- Ceratolobus discolor Becc. → Calamus hallierianus (Becc. ex K.Heyne) W.J.Baker
- Ceratolobus glaucescens Blume → Calamus glaucescens (Blume) D.Dietr.
- Ceratolobus kingianus Becc. → Calamus hallierianus (Becc. ex K.Heyne) W.J.Baker
- Ceratolobus pseudoconcolor J.Dransf. → Calamus pseudoconcolor (J.Dransf.) W.J.Baker
- Ceratolobus subangulatus (Miq.) Becc. → Calamus subangulatus Miq.

== Distribution and habitat ==
Not found above 1000 m, they are found in Thailand, Sumatra, Borneo, Java and the Malay peninsula. In all cases they form dense thickets, occupying hilly or low land rain forest or in the case of C. subangulatus, in Sarawak, heath forest. Their low quality and spininess limits cultivation and use.
