= Korthalsia laciniosa =

Scientific classification
- Kingdom: Plantae
- Clade: Tracheophytes
- Clade: Angiosperms
- Clade: Monocots
- Clade: Commelinids
- Order: Arecales
- Family: Arecaceae
- Genus: Korthalsia
- Species: K. laciniosa

Binomial name
- Korthalsia laciniosa (Griff.) Mart.

Synonyms
- Calamosagus harinaefolius Griff.; C. laciniosis Griff.; C. wallichiaefolia Griff.; Korthalsia andamanensis Becc.; K. grandis Ridley; K. robusta Bl.; K. scaphigera sensu Kurz non Griff. ex Mart.; K. teysmannii Miq.; K. wallichiaefolia (Griff.) H. Wendl.

Species of plant in the Arecaceae family

A large, very high liana, or "climbing tree" in the palm family, Korthalsia laciniosa occurs in the closed forests of Java, Sumatra, the Philippines, Malay Peninsula, Vietnam, Cambodia and elsewhere in Indochina, and the Nicobar and Andaman Islands.

== Habitat ==
The palm usually grows in lowland forests, often close to the coast, however on the Malay peninsula it has been observed growing in hill Dipterocarp forests up to 1000m elevation. It has been recorded from in the seasonal tropical forests of Cát Tiên and Bạch Mã National Parks in Vietnam, where it occurs in clumps of 4 to 20 individual stems, up to 7.2m long. It is described as a common species in the Andaman Islands, growing in the moist semi-evergreen and deciduous forests belt. Senthilkumar et al. however found it abundant in South Andaman, less common in Middle and North Andaman, and not common in the Nicobar Islands (where it is found in littoral and peripheral forest communities).

== Uses ==
K. laciniosa is known as mây tầm võng in Vietnam (mây is common to many rattans, including more common and numerous Calamus species; other names such as mây ra may be used locally). Before 1990 it was harvested for markets, however in 2005 it was only used locally in Bạch Mã: harvested when the stems are 10-15mm diameter, and so allowing the clumped palm to grow the height given above.

In Cambodia, there is demand for the plant to make ropes and baskets, it is known as phdau saôm or phdau soë:ng (in Khmer phdau="rattan").

In the Andaman & Nicobar Islands, rattan are integral materials to the livelihood of the inhabitants, this includes K. lacioniosa, known as rassi beth or rope beth. Small diameter canes are used to make fences and rafts, the same and the leaves are used for decorative purposes (such as tables and benches), especially during rituals and ceremonies of the Nicobarese. There is also a substantial export trade of rattan, with K. laciniosa highly valued yet only exported in small quantities. An earlier report on Korthalsia in the Andamans describes K. laciniosa as giving a robust and durable cane, occasionally used to make cane-chair frameworks, but becoming locally scarce in places on South Andaman due to over-extraction.
