= Ceratispa palmivora =

Scientific classification
- Kingdom: Animalia
- Phylum: Arthropoda
- Clade: Pancrustacea
- Class: Insecta
- Order: Coleoptera
- Suborder: Polyphaga
- Infraorder: Cucujiformia
- Family: Chrysomelidae
- Genus: Ceratispa
- Species: C. palmivora

Binomial name
- Ceratispa palmivora Gressitt, 1960

Species of beetle

Ceratispa palmivora is a species of beetle of the family Chrysomelidae. It is found in north-eastern New Guinea.

== Description ==
Adults reach a length of about 10 mm. They are reddish brown to black, while the head is reddish to pitchy. The antennae are dark reddish. The elytra are black, but reddish on the extreme base and at the basal portion of the suture and dull reddish on the posterior portion of the apical margin, extreme apex and posterior portion of the suture.

== Life history ==
The recorded host plants for this species are Calamus species.
