= Enischnispa daemonoropa =

Scientific classification
- Kingdom: Animalia
- Phylum: Arthropoda
- Clade: Pancrustacea
- Class: Insecta
- Order: Coleoptera
- Suborder: Polyphaga
- Infraorder: Cucujiformia
- Family: Chrysomelidae
- Genus: Enischnispa
- Species: E. daemonoropa

Binomial name
- Enischnispa daemonoropa Gressitt, 1963

Species of beetle

Enischnispa daemonoropa is a species of beetle of the family Chrysomelidae. It is found in south-western New Guinea.

== Description ==
Adults reach a length of about 4.25 mm. They are shiny black to pitchy black with pale legs.

== Biology ==
The recorded food plants are Daemonorops species.
