= Ceratispa papuensis =

Scientific classification
- Kingdom: Animalia
- Phylum: Arthropoda
- Clade: Pancrustacea
- Class: Insecta
- Order: Coleoptera
- Suborder: Polyphaga
- Infraorder: Cucujiformia
- Family: Chrysomelidae
- Genus: Ceratispa
- Species: C. papuensis

Binomial name
- Ceratispa papuensis Gressitt, 1963

Species of beetle

Ceratispa papuensis is a species of beetle of the family Chrysomelidae. It is found in south-eastern New Guinea.

== Description ==
Adults reach a length of about 9.6-11.7 mm. They are ochraceous to pitchy black, while the upper side of the head is reddish brown. The pronotum is orange ochraceous and the basal three-fifths of the elytra is pale ochraceous, while the rest is pitchy black.

== Life history ==
The recorded host plants for this species are Calamus species.
