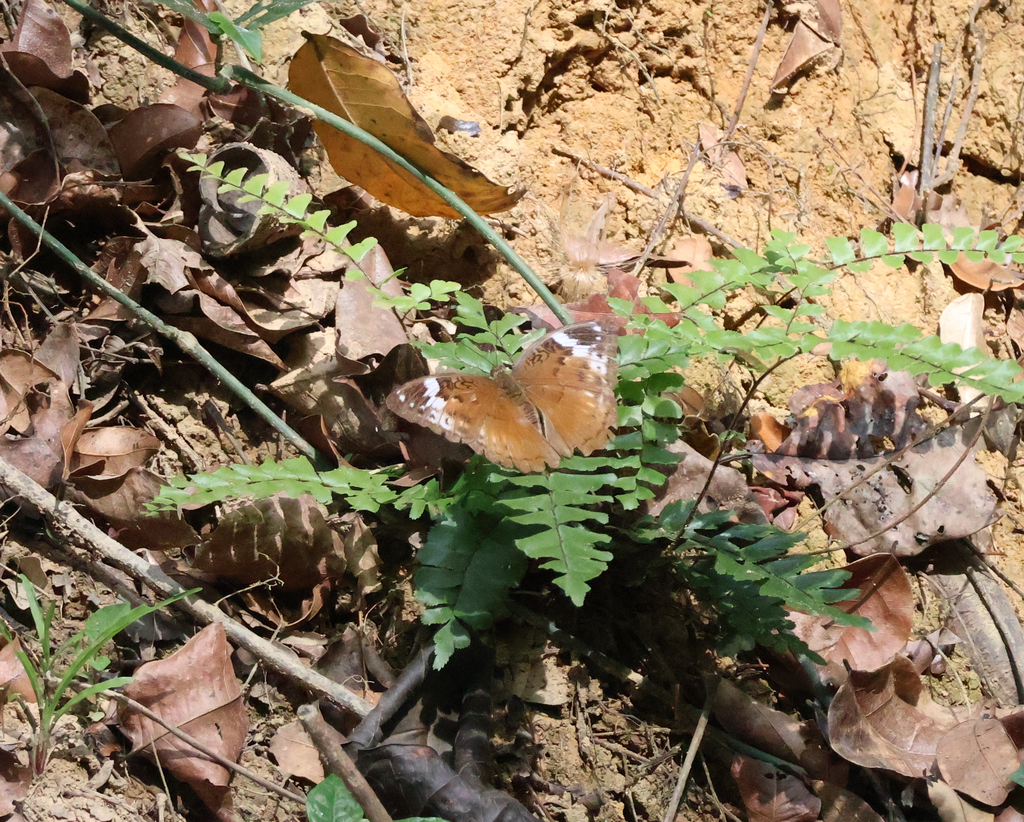

Scientific classification
- Kingdom: Animalia
- Phylum: Arthropoda
- Clade: Pancrustacea
- Class: Insecta
- Order: Lepidoptera
- Family: Nymphalidae
- Genus: Bebearia
- Species: B. paludicola

Binomial name
- Bebearia paludicola Holmes, 2001

Synonyms
- Bebearia (Apectinaria) paludicola; Euryphene mardania ab. paludicola Schultze, 1920

= Bebearia paludicola =

Species of butterfly

Bebearia paludicola, the swamp palm forester, is a butterfly in the family Nymphalidae. It is found in Sierra Leone, Ivory Coast, Ghana, Nigeria, Cameroon, Equatorial Guinea, the Republic of the Congo, the Central African Republic and the Democratic Republic of the Congo. The habitat consists of swampy areas in forests.

The larvae feed on Calamus deerratus.

== Subspecies ==
- Bebearia paludicola paludicola (Nigeria, Cameroon, Equatorial Guinea, Congo, Central African Republic)
- Bebearia paludicola blandi Holmes, 2001 (Sierra Leone, Ivory Coast, Ghana)

Torben Larsen developed a species numbering system for his 2005 publication Butterflies of West Africa. The nominate subspecies is #1012. The 'Larsen' numbers have since been used with permission in A Sharp Eye on Butterflies of Ghana.
