= Ceratispa piceonigra =

Scientific classification
- Kingdom: Animalia
- Phylum: Arthropoda
- Clade: Pancrustacea
- Class: Insecta
- Order: Coleoptera
- Suborder: Polyphaga
- Infraorder: Cucujiformia
- Family: Chrysomelidae
- Genus: Ceratispa
- Species: C. piceonigra

Binomial name
- Ceratispa piceonigra Gressitt, 1963

Species of beetle

Ceratispa piceonigra is a species of beetle of the family Chrysomelidae. It is found in south-eastern New Guinea.

== Description ==
Adults reach a length of about 10.5-11.8 mm. They are pitchy black to slightly reddish. The pronotum is black to pitchy reddish, while the elytra are black with a pitchy reddish tinge at the apex and the posterior portion of the external margin.

== Life history ==
The recorded host plants for this species are Calamus species.
