= Aspidispa daemonoropa =

Scientific classification
- Kingdom: Animalia
- Phylum: Arthropoda
- Class: Insecta
- Order: Coleoptera
- Suborder: Polyphaga
- Infraorder: Cucujiformia
- Family: Chrysomelidae
- Genus: Aspidispa
- Species: A. daemonoropa

Binomial name
- Aspidispa daemonoropa Gressitt, 1963

Species of beetle

Aspidispa daemonoropa is a species of beetle of the family Chrysomelidae. It is found in New Guinea.

== Description ==
Adults reach a length of about 3.6-4.2 mm. They are testaceous to pitchy black, the pronotum with the anterior portion of the side ochraceous. The elytra are also pitchy black, but tinged with reddish brown on the central area and outer margin.

== Life history ==
The recorded host plants for this species are Daemonorops species. The pupae have also been described. They are orange testaceous and reach a length of about 3.7 mm.
