= Ceratispa kolbei =

Scientific classification
- Kingdom: Animalia
- Phylum: Arthropoda
- Clade: Pancrustacea
- Class: Insecta
- Order: Coleoptera
- Suborder: Polyphaga
- Infraorder: Cucujiformia
- Family: Chrysomelidae
- Genus: Ceratispa
- Species: C. kolbei

Binomial name
- Ceratispa kolbei (Gestro, 1913)

Synonyms
- Xiphispa kolbei Gestro, 1913

Species of beetle

Ceratispa kolbei is a species of beetle of the family Chrysomelidae. It is found in north-eastern New Guinea.

== Life history ==
The recorded host plants for this species are rattan and Calamus species.
