= Ceratispa calami =

Scientific classification
- Kingdom: Animalia
- Phylum: Arthropoda
- Clade: Pancrustacea
- Class: Insecta
- Order: Coleoptera
- Suborder: Polyphaga
- Infraorder: Cucujiformia
- Family: Chrysomelidae
- Genus: Ceratispa
- Species: C. calami

Binomial name
- Ceratispa calami Gressitt, 1960

Species of beetle

Ceratispa calami is a species of beetle of the family Chrysomelidae. It is found in south-western New Guinea.

== Life history ==
The recorded host plants for this species are Calamus species. The larvae have been described. They reach a length of about 13 mm.
