= Aspidispa subviridipennis =

Scientific classification
- Kingdom: Animalia
- Phylum: Arthropoda
- Class: Insecta
- Order: Coleoptera
- Suborder: Polyphaga
- Infraorder: Cucujiformia
- Family: Chrysomelidae
- Genus: Aspidispa
- Species: A. subviridipennis

Binomial name
- Aspidispa subviridipennis Gressitt, 1963

Species of beetle

Aspidispa subviridipennis is a species of beetle of the family Chrysomelidae. It is found in south-eastern New Guinea.

== Description ==
Adults reach a length of about 3.8–4.2 mm. They are testaceous to greenish, while the head, pronotum and scutellum are reddish ochraceous. The elytra are dark metallic greenish, with the base and outer border reddish brown.

== Life history ==
The recorded host plants for this species are Korthalsia species. The larvae have also been described. They are pale testaceous and reach a length of 6 mm.
