= Aspidispa albertisii =

Scientific classification
- Kingdom: Animalia
- Phylum: Arthropoda
- Class: Insecta
- Order: Coleoptera
- Suborder: Polyphaga
- Infraorder: Cucujiformia
- Family: Chrysomelidae
- Genus: Aspidispa
- Species: A. albertisii

Binomial name
- Aspidispa albertisii Gestro, 1890

Species of beetle

Aspidispa albertisii is a species of beetle of the family Chrysomelidae. It is found in Papua New Guinea.

== Life history ==
The recorded host plants for this species are Korthalsia species.
