= Aspidispa flagellariae =

Scientific classification
- Kingdom: Animalia
- Phylum: Arthropoda
- Class: Insecta
- Order: Coleoptera
- Suborder: Polyphaga
- Infraorder: Cucujiformia
- Family: Chrysomelidae
- Genus: Aspidispa
- Species: A. flagellariae

Binomial name
- Aspidispa flagellariae Gressitt, 1963

Species of beetle

Aspidispa flagellariae is a species of beetle of the family Chrysomelidae. It is found in north-western and north-eastern New Guinea.

== Description ==
Adults reach a length of about 3.5-4 mm. They are testaceous to reddish and pitchy, while the pronotum is reddish ochraceous. The elytra are reddish on the base, while the rest is pitchy with a reddish to metallic tinge.

== Life history ==
The recorded host plants for this species are Flagellaria species.
