= Aspidispa wilsoni =

Scientific classification
- Kingdom: Animalia
- Phylum: Arthropoda
- Clade: Pancrustacea
- Class: Insecta
- Order: Coleoptera
- Suborder: Polyphaga
- Infraorder: Cucujiformia
- Family: Chrysomelidae
- Genus: Aspidispa
- Species: A. wilsoni

Binomial name
- Aspidispa wilsoni Gressitt, 1963

Species of beetle

Aspidispa wilsoni is a species of beetle of the family Chrysomelidae. It is found in north-western New Guinea and Yapen.

== Description ==
Adults reach a length of about 3.7-4 mm. They are pale ochraceous to pitchy black.

== Life history ==
The recorded host plants for this species are rattan (Arecaceae).
