= Ceratispa spiniceps =

Scientific classification
- Kingdom: Animalia
- Phylum: Arthropoda
- Clade: Pancrustacea
- Class: Insecta
- Order: Coleoptera
- Suborder: Polyphaga
- Infraorder: Cucujiformia
- Family: Chrysomelidae
- Genus: Ceratispa
- Species: C. spiniceps

Binomial name
- Ceratispa spiniceps (Weise, 1911)

Synonyms
- Xiphispa spiniceps Weise, 1911

Species of beetle

Ceratispa spiniceps is a species of beetle of the family Chrysomelidae. It is found in north-western and south-western New Guinea and on Biak.

== Life history ==
The recorded host plants for this species are Pinanga species. Both the larvae and pupae have been described. Both reach a length of about 13.5 mm.
