= Ceratispa sedlaceki =

Scientific classification
- Kingdom: Animalia
- Phylum: Arthropoda
- Clade: Pancrustacea
- Class: Insecta
- Order: Coleoptera
- Suborder: Polyphaga
- Infraorder: Cucujiformia
- Family: Chrysomelidae
- Genus: Ceratispa
- Species: C. sedlaceki

Binomial name
- Ceratispa sedlaceki Gressitt, 1963

Species of beetle

Ceratispa sedlaceki is a species of beetle of the family Chrysomelidae. It is found in north-eastern New Guinea.

== Description ==
Adults reach a length of about 11-11.5 mm. They are pale testaceous to pitchy black, while the pronotum and scutellum are pale ochraceous. The elytra are ochraceous basally, but reddish brown apically, with a black sutural stripe.

== Life history ==
The recorded host plants for this species are rattan species.
