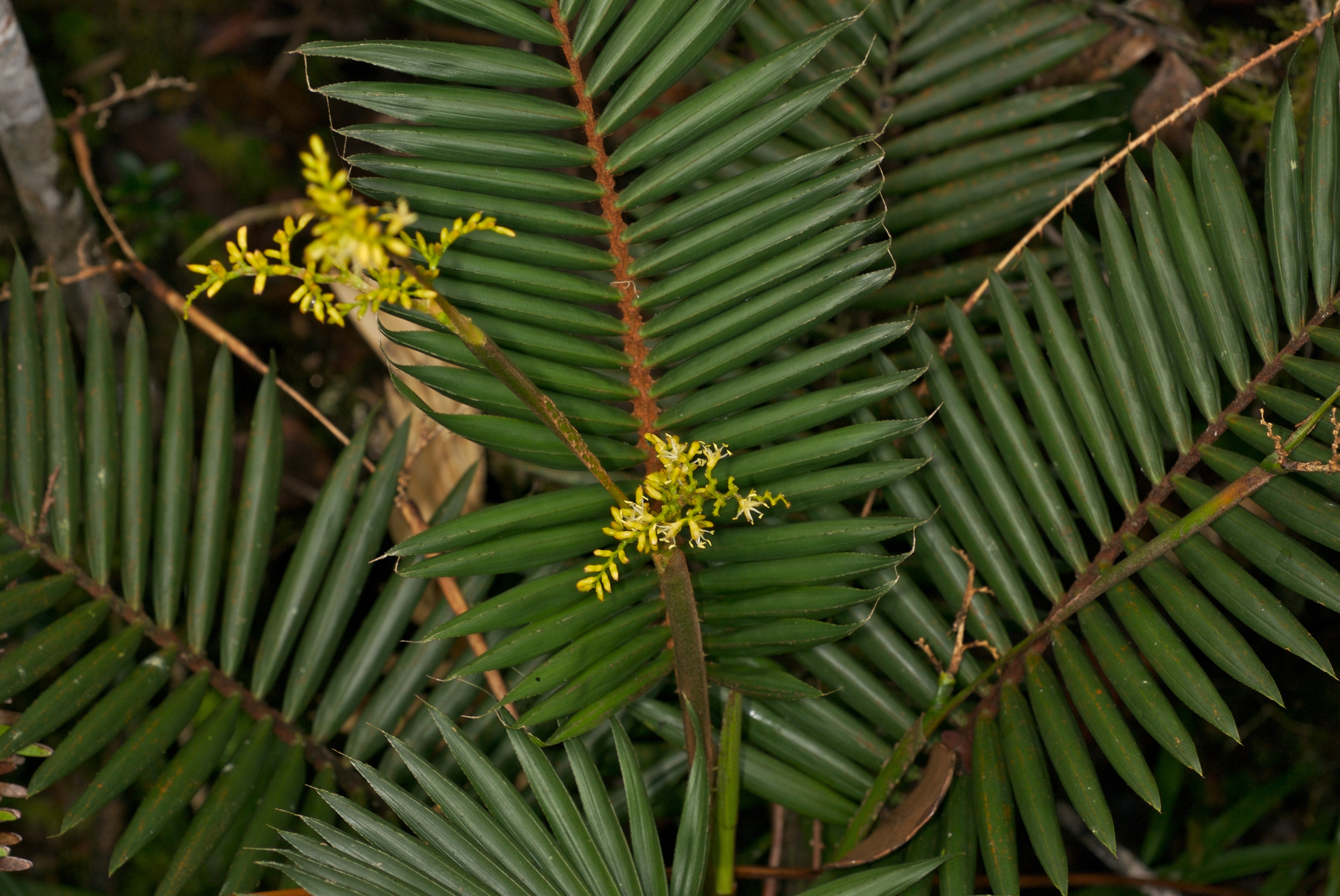

Scientific classification
- Kingdom: Plantae
- Clade: Tracheophytes
- Clade: Angiosperms
- Clade: Monocots
- Clade: Commelinids
- Order: Arecales
- Family: Arecaceae
- Genus: Calamus
- Species: C. gibbsianus

Binomial name
- Calamus gibbsianus Becc.

Synonyms
- Calamus dachangensis Furtado

= Calamus gibbsianus =

Species of palm

Calamus gibbsianus is a species of rattan palm in the genus Calamus endemic to the Malaysian states of Sabah and Sarawak on the island of Borneo. It is a highly polymorphic species and reaches the highest altitude of any palm in Borneo, growing in montane forest at elevations of 1,400–3,000 m (4,600–9,800 ft).

== Description ==
Calamus gibbsianus is a slender, clustering montane rattan that climbs to 8 m (26 ft), rarely more, and is very rarely more or less stemless. The stem measures 4–8 mm (0.16–0.31 in) in diameter without sheaths, and 7–30 mm (0.28–1.18 in) with sheaths. The internodes are short, rarely exceeding 10 cm (3.9 in).

The sheaths are dull mid to dark green, sparsely to densely armed with pale green spines up to 7 mm (0.28 in) long, occasionally also with minute spicules arranged in partial whorls. The sheaths and spines are all densely covered in brown indumentum. The knee is conspicuous, while the ocrea is inconspicuous to well developed, armed with groups of spicules or bristles. The flagellum reaches up to 1 m (3.3 ft) in length but is rarely absent.

The leaf is ecirrate, measuring up to 70 cm (28 in) on climbing stems, longer in stemless forms. The petiole is 3–18 cm (1.2–7.1 in) long and sparsely to densely armed. The rachis is covered with rusty-brown hairs. The leaflets are regularly arranged, with 6–20 on each side of the rachis, distant to crowded and lanceolate in shape. Mid-leaf leaflets measure 45–200 mm (1.8–7.9 in) by 7–25 mm (0.28–0.98 in). The leaflets are usually very densely covered with minute spine-like papillae or short bristles on the undersurface and occasionally on the upper surface, always with a dense tuft of orange to red-brown hairs on the undersurface at the leaflet base.

The inflorescence is usually about 1 m (3.3 ft) long, with 1–4 partial inflorescences up to 10 cm (3.9 in) each. The inflorescence branches are strongly recurved and bear short recurved rachillae, large conspicuous saucer-like bracteoles, and relatively large flowers. The mature fruit is spherical to ovoid, measuring up to 16 mm (0.63 in) by 12 mm (0.47 in), tipped by a short beak and covered in 15–18 vertical rows of pale brown, black-edged scales. The seed is ovoid to more or less oblong, up to 14 mm (0.55 in) by 7 mm (0.28 in), deeply pitted and grooved, with subruminate endosperm. The seedling leaf is pinnate with about 6 leaflets.

== Distribution and habitat ==
In Sarawak, Calamus gibbsianus is known only from one collection from the Kelabit Highlands. In Sabah, it occurs in montane forest on Mount Kinabalu and the Crocker Range at elevations of 1,400–3,000 m (4,600–9,800 ft). It grows primarily in the wet tropical biome.

== Etymology ==
The species is named in honour of Lilian Suzette Gibbs (1870–1925), a British botanist and plant collector who made an important expedition to Mount Kinabalu.

== Uses ==
In Sabah, Calamus gibbsianus has been used for general tying and weaving by successive expeditions to Mount Kinabalu.

== Conservation ==
The species has been predicted to be threatened with extinction, although this assessment has low confidence.
