= Ceratispa cyclops =

Scientific classification
- Kingdom: Animalia
- Phylum: Arthropoda
- Clade: Pancrustacea
- Class: Insecta
- Order: Coleoptera
- Suborder: Polyphaga
- Infraorder: Cucujiformia
- Family: Chrysomelidae
- Genus: Ceratispa
- Species: C. cyclops

Binomial name
- Ceratispa cyclops Gressitt, 1963

Species of beetle

Ceratispa cyclops is a species of beetle of the family Chrysomelidae. It is found in north-western New Guinea.

== Description ==
Adults reach a length of about 11-12.5 mm. They are orange ochraceous to dark pitchy brown. The pronotum is orange a pitchy black median stripe and lateral reddish brown stripes. The elytra have the suture and a humeral stripe dark pitchy brown.

== Life history ==
The recorded host plants for this species are palms (Arecaceae). Both the larvae and pupae have also been described. The former reach a length of about 14 mm, while the latter are about 15 mm long.
