= Aspidispa sedlaceki =

Scientific classification
- Kingdom: Animalia
- Phylum: Arthropoda
- Clade: Pancrustacea
- Class: Insecta
- Order: Coleoptera
- Suborder: Polyphaga
- Infraorder: Cucujiformia
- Family: Chrysomelidae
- Genus: Aspidispa
- Species: A. sedlaceki

Binomial name
- Aspidispa sedlaceki Gressitt, 1963

Species of beetle

Aspidispa sedlaceki is a species of beetle of the family Chrysomelidae. It is found in north-eastern New Guinea.

== Description ==
Adults reach a length of about 3.2–3.8 mm. They are pale testaceous to shiny black, while the elytra are pale yellowish testaceous on the basal two-fifths, while the rest is pitchy black (with some brownish at the apex).

== Life history ==
The recorded host plants for this species are rattan (Arecaceae). The larvae have also been described. They are pale testaceous and reach a length of 6 mm.
