= Ceratispa normanbyensis =

Scientific classification
- Kingdom: Animalia
- Phylum: Arthropoda
- Clade: Pancrustacea
- Class: Insecta
- Order: Coleoptera
- Suborder: Polyphaga
- Infraorder: Cucujiformia
- Family: Chrysomelidae
- Genus: Ceratispa
- Species: C. normanbyensis

Binomial name
- Ceratispa normanbyensis Gressitt, 1960

Species of beetle

Ceratispa normanbyensis is a species of beetle of the family Chrysomelidae. It is found on Normanby Island.

== Description ==
Adults reach a length of about 10.9 mm (males) and 11 mm (females). They are reddish ochraceous to pitchy black. The antennae are pitchy red basally and pitchy black apically. The basal two-fifths of the elytra is ochraceous, while the remainder is pitchy. The apical margins however, are dark reddish.

== Life history ==
The recorded host plants for this species are palms (Arecaceae).
