= Aspidispa rattani =

Scientific classification
- Kingdom: Animalia
- Phylum: Arthropoda
- Clade: Pancrustacea
- Class: Insecta
- Order: Coleoptera
- Suborder: Polyphaga
- Infraorder: Cucujiformia
- Family: Chrysomelidae
- Genus: Aspidispa
- Species: A. rattani

Binomial name
- Aspidispa rattani Gressitt, 1963

Species of beetle

Aspidispa rattani is a species of beetle of the family Chrysomelidae. It is found in north-eastern New Guinea.

== Description ==
Adults reach a length of about 4.1 mm. They are pitchy black to testaceous, with the head bluish black above and pale brown on the underside.

== Life history ==
The recorded host plants for this species are Freycinetia species and rattan (Arecaceae).
