= Ceratispa legalis =

Scientific classification
- Kingdom: Animalia
- Phylum: Arthropoda
- Clade: Pancrustacea
- Class: Insecta
- Order: Coleoptera
- Suborder: Polyphaga
- Infraorder: Cucujiformia
- Family: Chrysomelidae
- Genus: Ceratispa
- Species: C. legalis

Binomial name
- Ceratispa legalis Gressitt, 1960

Species of beetle

Ceratispa legalis is a species of beetle of the family Chrysomelidae. It is found on New Britain.

== Description ==
Adults reach a length of about 10.5 mm. They are black, slightly tinged with greenish on the pronotum and with greenish-blue on the elytra. The antennae are reddish pitchy and the head and legs are reddish.

== Life history ==
The recorded host plants for this species are rattan species.
