= Calamus rudentum =

Scientific classification
- Kingdom: Plantae
- Clade: Tracheophytes
- Clade: Angiosperms
- Clade: Monocots
- Clade: Commelinids
- Order: Arecales
- Family: Arecaceae
- Genus: Calamus
- Species: C. rudentum

Binomial name
- Calamus rudentum Lour.

Species of plant

Calamus rudentum is a liana in the palm family Arecaceae native to Thailand. It is a rattan with a very long inflorescence, up to 14 m (46 ft) long, of which the three-quarters proximal to the stem is the inflorescence sensu stricto with 100,000 flowers, while the distal quarter is a flagellum (a spiny pseudo-tendril which aids the vine in climbing).
