= Calamus flagellum =

Scientific classification
- Kingdom: Plantae
- Clade: Tracheophytes
- Clade: Angiosperms
- Clade: Monocots
- Clade: Commelinids
- Order: Arecales
- Family: Arecaceae
- Genus: Calamus
- Species: C. flagellum

Binomial name
- Calamus flagellum Griff. ex Mart.

Synonyms
- List: Palmijuncus polygamus (Roxb.) Kuntze Palmijuncus flagellum (Griff. ex Mart.) Kuntze Calamus polygamus Roxb. Calamus karinensis (Becc.) S.J.Pei & S.Y.Chen Calamus jenkinsianus Griff. Calamus flagellum karinensis Calamus flagellum furvifurfuraceus

Species of palm

Calamus flagellum is an Asian species of tropical forest rattan liana in the family Arecaceae, with a native range from Assam to southern China and Indo-China. Its name in Vietnamese is mây song, while the Lepcha of Sikkim call it rim.

== Description ==
Calamus flagellum is a strong climber with stems in clusters forming The individual rattan stems form from a leafsheath up to 45 mm in diameter. Leaves are described as "ecirrate" (without a cirrus: extension of the rattan leaf tip armed with grappling hooks), produced from leafsheaths 6 – 7 m long. Petioles are about 10 mm in diameter, armed with whorls of 10 – 30 mm spines; the leaflets are equidistant, broadly ensiform, with a prominent single vein on upper side; middle leaflets are longer, up to 600 mm long.

Male and female inflorescences are 5 m or more long and armed with claws. The flagellum is attached here (this is a whiplike climbing organ bearing reflexed strong claws on the lower side). Partial inflorescences occur which are about 1 m long with 3-4 rachillae on each side. The primary closely sheathing bract is tubular and fibrous at upper end. The rachillae are 100–250 mm long, each bearing 10-30 flowers. Male flowers are 8 – 10 mm x 3 mm, curved on the outside. Female flowers are about 7 mm long, with an ovate, 3-toothed calyx and lanceolate petals, positioned remotely on the rachillae (which are 200–250 mm long, truncate and projected from the basal bract). The fruit are about 30 mm long, broadly ovoid with fruit scales deeply channelled in the middle.
