= Aspidispa =

Scientific classification
- Kingdom: Animalia
- Phylum: Arthropoda
- Class: Insecta
- Order: Coleoptera
- Suborder: Polyphaga
- Infraorder: Cucujiformia
- Family: Chrysomelidae
- Subfamily: Cassidinae
- Tribe: Gonophorini
- Genus: Aspidispa; Baly, 1869

Genus of leaf beetles

Aspidispa is a genus of beetles belonging to the family Chrysomelidae.

== Species ==
- Aspidispa albertisii Gestro, 1890
- Aspidispa bicolor Gressitt, 1963
- Aspidispa calami Gressitt, 1963
- Aspidispa daemonoropa Gressitt, 1963
- Aspidispa expansa Gressitt, 1957
- Aspidispa flagellariae Gressitt, 1963
- Aspidispa horvathi Gestro, 1897
- Aspidispa ifara Gressitt, 1963
- Aspidispa korthalsiae Gressitt, 1963
- Aspidispa lata Gressitt, 1963
- Aspidispa maai Gressitt, 1963
- Aspidispa meijerei (Weise, 1908)
- Aspidispa nigritarsis Gestro, 1890
- Aspidispa palmella Gressitt, 1960
- Aspidispa papuana Gressitt, 1963
- Aspidispa pinangae Gressitt, 1963
- Aspidispa rattani Gressitt, 1963
- Aspidispa rotanica Gressitt, 1963
- Aspidispa sedlaceki Gressitt, 1963
- Aspidispa striata Gressitt, 1963
- Aspidispa subviridipennis Gressitt, 1963
- Aspidispa tibialis Baly, 1869
- Aspidispa wilsoni Gressitt, 1963
