= Ceratispa loriae =

Scientific classification
- Kingdom: Animalia
- Phylum: Arthropoda
- Clade: Pancrustacea
- Class: Insecta
- Order: Coleoptera
- Suborder: Polyphaga
- Infraorder: Cucujiformia
- Family: Chrysomelidae
- Genus: Ceratispa
- Species: C. loriae

Binomial name
- Ceratispa loriae Gestro, 1895

Species of beetle

Ceratispa loriae is a species of beetle of the family Chrysomelidae. It is found in Papua New Guinea.

== Life history ==
No host plant has been documented for this species.
