= Calamus periacanthus =

Scientific classification
- Kingdom: Plantae
- Clade: Tracheophytes
- Clade: Angiosperms
- Clade: Monocots
- Clade: Commelinids
- Order: Arecales
- Family: Arecaceae
- Genus: Calamus
- Species: C. periacanthus

Binomial name
- Calamus periacanthus (Miq.) Miq.

Synonyms
- Daemonorops periacantha Miq.; Daemonorops dissitophylla Becc.; Daemonorops florida Becc.; Palmijuncus periacanthus (Miq.) Kuntze; Rotang periacanthus (Miq.) Baill.

Species of flowering plant

Calamus periacanthus is a species of flowering plant, a dioecious rattan in the palm family, that is native to Southeast Asia.

== Name ==
Local vernacular names include rotan jagung and wi empunok.

== Description ==
The palms branch at the base to form several stems, which climb up to 10 m in height. The green stems are covered with yellow spines up to 8 cm long. The whiplike tendrils at the end of the rachis are covered with reflexed spines which act as grappling hooks to climb through the forest foliage. Each palm bears either male or female inflorescences, with panicles up to 1 m long on peduncles up to 50 cm long. The fruits are round, with the epicarp covered with pale brown scales, containing a single round seed in an edible, translucent, sweet-sour sarcotesta.

== Distribution and habitat ==
The species occurs in the Malay Peninsula, Sumatra and Borneo, where it is found in lowland and hill dipterocarp forest up to an elevation of 800 m.
