= Aspidispa tibialis =

Scientific classification
- Kingdom: Animalia
- Phylum: Arthropoda
- Class: Insecta
- Order: Coleoptera
- Suborder: Polyphaga
- Infraorder: Cucujiformia
- Family: Chrysomelidae
- Genus: Aspidispa
- Species: A. tibialis

Binomial name
- Aspidispa tibialis Baly, 1869

Species of beetle

Aspidispa tibialis is a species of beetle of the family Chrysomelidae. It is found in New Guinea and on the Moluccas.

== Description ==
The antennae are not quite half the length of the body, slender and filiform. The thorax is nearly twice as broad as long, the sides distinctly margined, nearly straight and slightly diverging from the base to beyond the middle, then broadly rounded to the apex, with the outer edge finely serrate. The disc is convex, excavated on the sides, the base impressed with a broad semilunate sulcation. Scattered irregularly over the disc are some large deeply impressed punctures. The elytra are much broader at the base than the thorax. The upper surface of each elytron has three raised longitudinal costae, their interspaces each with a double row of punctures. The interstices between the punctures are also thickened, and form irregular transverse costae. On the surface of the disc are a number of large irregular excavations, which obliterate not only the costae, but to a great extent the punctures themselves.

== Life history ==
No host plant has been documented for this species.
