= Aspidispa ifara =

Scientific classification
- Kingdom: Animalia
- Phylum: Arthropoda
- Class: Insecta
- Order: Coleoptera
- Suborder: Polyphaga
- Infraorder: Cucujiformia
- Family: Chrysomelidae
- Genus: Aspidispa
- Species: A. ifara

Binomial name
- Aspidispa ifara Gressitt, 1963

Species of beetle

Aspidispa ifara is a species of beetle of the family Chrysomelidae. It is found in north-western New Guinea.

== Description ==
Adults reach a length of about 4.7-6.5 mm. They are yellowish testacous to pitchy black.

== Life history ==
The recorded host plants for this species are palms (Arecaceae). The larvae have also been described. They are whitish testaceous, but more yellowish on the pronotum.
