= Korthalsia bejaudii =

Scientific classification
- Kingdom: Plantae
- Clade: Tracheophytes
- Clade: Angiosperms
- Clade: Monocots
- Clade: Commelinids
- Order: Arecales
- Family: Arecaceae
- Genus: Korthalsia
- Species: K. bejaudii

Binomial name
- Korthalsia bejaudii Gagnep.

Species of palm

A liana in the Arecaceae, or palm, family, Korthalsia bejaudii is an endemic growing in the forests of Cambodia, noted from Kampong Cham Province. The species is distinguished by shortened, truncate ocrea that do not disintegrate and possessing flattened spines, crowded near the tip, and leaves that are the same colour either side.

Luxury canes and baskets were manufactured from the stalks, its names in Cambodia include phdau prèah and prèah phdau (phdau='rattan', prèah='sacred', Khmer).
