= Aspidispa maai =

Scientific classification
- Kingdom: Animalia
- Phylum: Arthropoda
- Clade: Pancrustacea
- Class: Insecta
- Order: Coleoptera
- Suborder: Polyphaga
- Infraorder: Cucujiformia
- Family: Chrysomelidae
- Genus: Aspidispa
- Species: A. maai

Binomial name
- Aspidispa maai Gressitt, 1963

Species of beetle

Aspidispa maai is a species of beetle of the family Chrysomelidae. It is found in north-western New Guinea.

== Description ==
Adults reach a length of about 3.4-4.6 mm. They are testaceous to pitchy black, while the pronotum has pale ochraceous central portion. The elytra are also pitchy black, but with a reddish brown tinge.

== Life history ==
The recorded host plants for this species are Pinanga species.
