= Ceratispa =

Scientific classification
- Kingdom: Animalia
- Phylum: Arthropoda
- Clade: Pancrustacea
- Class: Insecta
- Order: Coleoptera
- Suborder: Polyphaga
- Infraorder: Cucujiformia
- Family: Chrysomelidae
- Subfamily: Cassidinae
- Tribe: Cryptonychini
- Genus: Ceratispa; Gestro, 1895

Genus of leaf beetles

Ceratispa is a genus of beetles belonging to the family Chrysomelidae.

== Species ==
- Subgenus Ceratispa
  - Ceratispa biroi Gestro, 1897
  - Ceratispa buergersi (Uhmann, 1952)
  - Ceratispa cyclops Gressitt, 1963
  - Ceratispa furcirostris Gressitt, 1963
  - Ceratispa loriae (Gestro, 1895)
  - Ceratispa palmicola Gressitt, 1963
  - Ceratispa spiniceps (Weise, 1911)
- Subgenus Metallispa Gressitt, 1963
  - Ceratispa atra Gressitt, 1957
  - Ceratispa metallica (Gestro, 1885)
- Subgenus Papuispa Gressitt, 1963
  - Ceratispa brandti Gressitt, 1960
  - Ceratispa calami Gressitt, 1960
  - Ceratispa kolbei (Gestro, 1913)
  - Ceratispa latirostris (Gestro, 1885)
  - Ceratispa meijerei (Weise, 1911)
  - Ceratispa normanbyensis Gressitt, 1960
  - Ceratispa palmivora Gressitt, 1960
  - Ceratispa papuensis Gressitt, 1963
  - Ceratispa piceonigra Gressitt, 1963
  - Ceratispa pinangae Gressitt, 1960
  - Ceratispa rotana Gressitt, 1963
  - Ceratispa sedlaceki Gressitt, 1963
  - Ceratispa wilsoni Gressitt, 1963
- incertae sedis
  - Ceratispa legalis Gressitt, 1960
