= Ceratispa rotana =

Scientific classification
- Kingdom: Animalia
- Phylum: Arthropoda
- Clade: Pancrustacea
- Class: Insecta
- Order: Coleoptera
- Suborder: Polyphaga
- Infraorder: Cucujiformia
- Family: Chrysomelidae
- Genus: Ceratispa
- Species: C. rotana

Binomial name
- Ceratispa rotana Gressitt, 1963

Species of beetle

Ceratispa rotana is a species of beetle of the family Chrysomelidae. It is found in north-western New Guinea.

== Description ==
Adults reach a length of about 10-11.6 mm. They are pale orange testaceous to black. The pronotum is pale orange, with a black spot, while the elytra are mostly black.

== Life history ==
The recorded host plants for this species are rattan species.
