= Ceratispa buergersi =

Scientific classification
- Kingdom: Animalia
- Phylum: Arthropoda
- Clade: Pancrustacea
- Class: Insecta
- Order: Coleoptera
- Suborder: Polyphaga
- Infraorder: Cucujiformia
- Family: Chrysomelidae
- Genus: Ceratispa
- Species: C. buergersi

Binomial name
- Ceratispa buergersi (Uhmann, 1952)

Synonyms
- Plesispa (Ceratispa) buergersi Uhmann, 1952

Species of beetle

Ceratispa buergersi is a species of beetle of the family Chrysomelidae. It is found in north-eastern New Guinea.

== Life history ==
No host plant has been documented for this species.
