= Aspidispa horvathi =

Scientific classification
- Kingdom: Animalia
- Phylum: Arthropoda
- Class: Insecta
- Order: Coleoptera
- Suborder: Polyphaga
- Infraorder: Cucujiformia
- Family: Chrysomelidae
- Genus: Aspidispa
- Species: A. horvathi

Binomial name
- Aspidispa horvathi Gestro, 1897

Synonyms
- Aspidispa signaticollis Gestro, 1898

Species of beetle

Aspidispa horvathi is a species of beetle of the family Chrysomelidae. It is found in north-eastern New Guinea and the Bismarck Islands.

== Life history ==
No host plant has been documented for this species.
