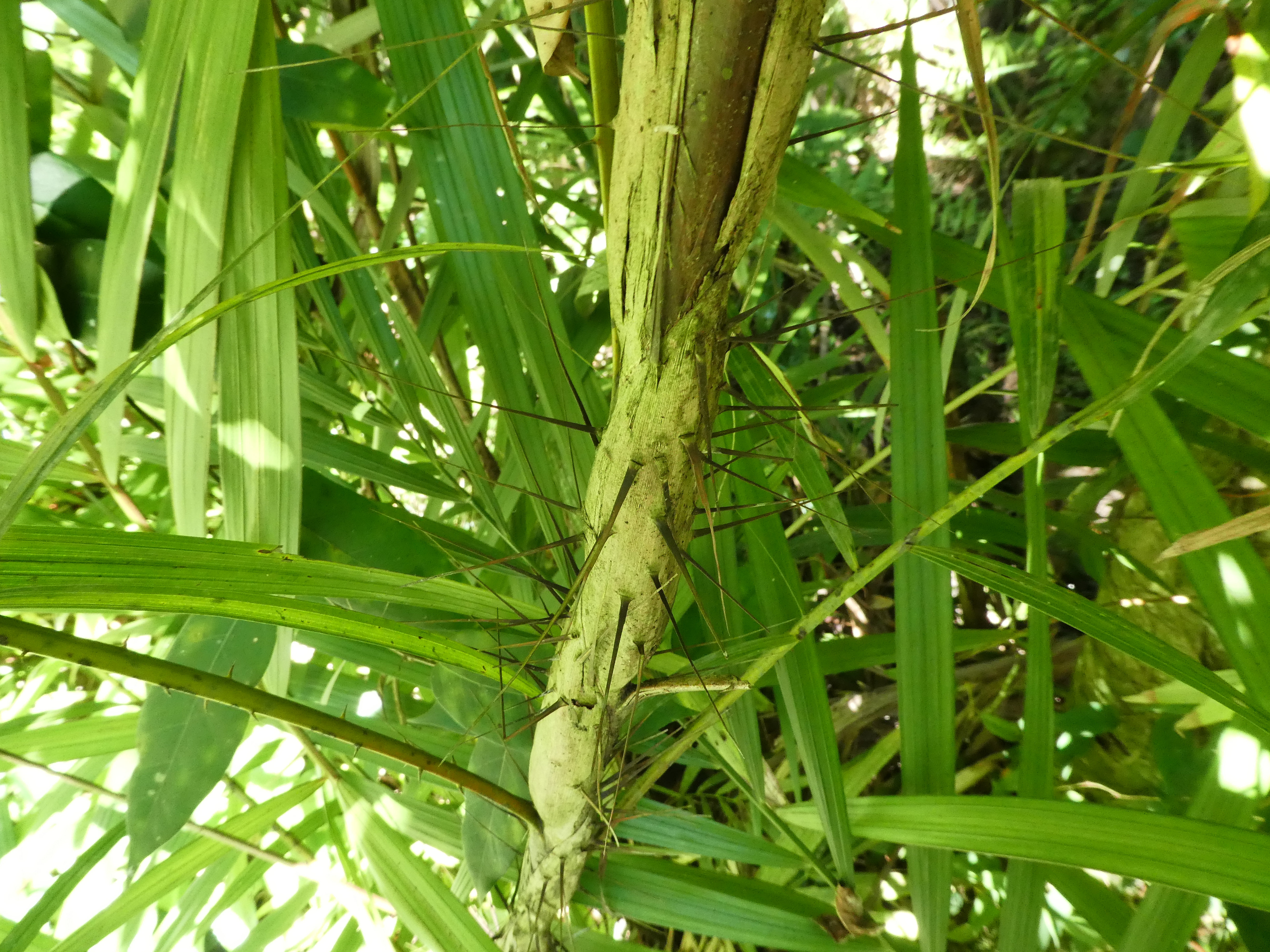
- Stem

Scientific classification
- Kingdom: Plantae
- Clade: Tracheophytes
- Clade: Angiosperms
- Clade: Monocots
- Clade: Commelinids
- Order: Arecales
- Family: Arecaceae
- Genus: Korthalsia
- Species: K. echinometra

Binomial name
- Korthalsia echinometra Becc.

Synonyms
- Calamus ochreatus Miq.; Daemonorops ochreata Teijsm. & Binn.; Korthalsia angustifolia var. gracilis Miq.; Korthalsia horrida Becc.

= Korthalsia echinometra =

Species of flowering plant

Korthalsia echinometra is a species of climbing plant in the palm family Arecaceae. It is native to Borneo, Malaysia and Sumatra.
