= Calamus brandisii =

Scientific classification
- Kingdom: Plantae
- Clade: Tracheophytes
- Clade: Angiosperms
- Clade: Monocots
- Clade: Commelinids
- Order: Arecales
- Family: Arecaceae
- Genus: Calamus
- Species: C. brandisii

Binomial name
- Calamus brandisii Becc.

Species of palm

Calamus brandisii is a slender, clump-forming rattan species, with un-sheathed stems measuring up to about 0.8 cm in diameter.

== Distribution ==
This species occurs in the evergreen forests of the Western Ghats, within the Kerala and Tamil Nadu regions, at elevations of about 1000–1500 m above sea level..

== Phenology ==
Flowering: October- December Fruiting: March – May.
