= Calamus acanthospathus =

Conservation status
- Least Concern (IUCN 3.1)

Scientific classification
- Kingdom: Plantae
- Clade: Tracheophytes
- Clade: Angiosperms
- Clade: Monocots
- Clade: Commelinids
- Order: Arecales
- Family: Arecaceae
- Genus: Calamus
- Species: C. acanthospathus

Binomial name
- Calamus acanthospathus Griff., 1845

Synonyms
- List: Calamus feanus Becc., 1892; Calamus feanus var. medogensis S.J.Pei & S.Y.Chen, 1989; Calamus montanus T.Anderson, 1869; Calamus yunnanensis Govaerts, 1999; Palmijuncus acanthospathus (Griff.) Kuntze, 1891; Palmijuncus montanus (T.Anderson) Kuntze, 1891

Species of palm

Calamus acanthospathus is a species of flowering plant in the palm family Arecaceae.
