= Ceratispa palmicola =

Scientific classification
- Kingdom: Animalia
- Phylum: Arthropoda
- Clade: Pancrustacea
- Class: Insecta
- Order: Coleoptera
- Suborder: Polyphaga
- Infraorder: Cucujiformia
- Family: Chrysomelidae
- Genus: Ceratispa
- Species: C. palmicola

Binomial name
- Ceratispa palmicola Gressitt, 1963

Species of beetle

Ceratispa palmicola is a species of beetle of the family Chrysomelidae. It is found in north-eastern New Guinea.

== Description ==
Adults reach a length of about 10.5-11.6 mm. They are shiny yellowish testaceous marked with reddish to pitchy black. The pronotum is shiny pale yellow with two blackish stripes, while the elytra are testaceous.

== Life history ==
The recorded host plants for this species are small pinnate palms (Arecaceae).
