= Calamus pygmaeus =

Scientific classification
- Kingdom: Plantae
- Clade: Tracheophytes
- Clade: Angiosperms
- Clade: Monocots
- Clade: Commelinids
- Order: Arecales
- Family: Arecaceae
- Genus: Calamus
- Species: C. pygmaeus

Binomial name
- Calamus pygmaeus Becc.

Synonyms
- Palmijuncus pygmaeus (Becc.) Kuntze

Species of palm

Calamus pygmaeus is a species of rattan palm native to western Sarawak state in Malaysian Borneo. It is a subshrub most notable for having plantlets at the end of its fronds (very unusual for a palm) which enable asexual reproduction.

The species was first described by Odoardo Beccari in 1886.
