= Korthalsia rogersii =

Scientific classification
- Kingdom: Plantae
- Clade: Tracheophytes
- Clade: Angiosperms
- Clade: Monocots
- Clade: Commelinids
- Order: Arecales
- Family: Arecaceae
- Genus: Korthalsia
- Species: K. rogersii

Binomial name
- Korthalsia rogersii Becc.

Species of palm

Korthalsia rogersii is an endangered endemic rattan species, thought to be extinct from the insular habitat of the Andaman Islands in the Indian Ocean until 1993. Korthalsia rogersii was first described by Odoardo Beccari in 1918 based on two herbarium field specimens collected by C. G. Rogers in 1904 from the South Andaman Island. This species was known only from these two collections until 1993. Sam Mathew and Pakshirajan Lakshminarasinhan (Botanical Survey of India) were able to find the species again at Chidiyatapu forests of the South Andamans after a gap of about 100 years. Live collections are introduced at Tropical Botanical Garden and Research Institute, Trivandrum, South India.
