= Calamus latifolius =

Scientific classification
- Kingdom: Plantae
- Clade: Tracheophytes
- Clade: Angiosperms
- Clade: Monocots
- Clade: Commelinids
- Order: Arecales
- Family: Arecaceae
- Genus: Calamus
- Species: C. latifolius

Binomial name
- Calamus latifolius Roxb., Hort. Bengal. 73; Fl. Ind. iii. 775 (1832)

Synonyms
- Calamus dumetorum Ridl.; C. gregisectus Burret; C. humilis Roxb.; C. kerrianus Becc.; C. loeiensis Hodel; C. macracanthus T.Anderson; C. palustris Griff.; C. palustris var. cochinchinensis Becc.; Palmijuncus humilis (Roxb.) Kuntze; P. latifolius (Roxb.) Kuntze; P. macracanthus (T.Anderson) Kuntze; P. palustris (Griff.) Kuntze

Species of palm

Calamus latifolius is a climbing plant, part of a subfamily, Calamoideae, whose members are usually called rattans in English, they are part of the Arecaceae, or palm, family.

== Description ==
It is a moderately robust climber, growing up to 30m, usually with a cluster of stems and a leafsheath 3 cm in diameter. Its leaves are curate, 2-3m long, with a prominently kneed, spiny (3 cm long) leafsheath. Both female and male flowers are simply decompound. The globose fruit is dull brown to blackish, with flattened fruit scales and a single seed. The rattan grows in semi-dense forests of Cambodia and southern Vietnam. In the Chuŏr Phnum Dâmrei of southwestern Cambodia, they are characterized as growing on the edge of evergreen rainforest, usually as understorey, but becoming lianas when mature. It also occurs as a large liana in the forest around Steung Sangke in the northwest of Cambodia. Growing in the Sitakunda Botanical Garden and Eco-park, Bangladesh, it is regarded as under threat from illicit felling, over-harvesting for raw material and intentional fire hazards during the dry season. In India it occurs in moist lower hill forest communities up to 1000m, mostly near fresh water swamps.

== Distribution and ecology ==
It is native to: Peninsular Malaysia; Thailand; Cambodia; southern Vietnam; Laos; Andaman and Nicobar Islands; Myanmar; Bangladesh; Manipur, Nagaland, Arunachal Pradesh, Assam, Meghalaya, Sikkim, and West Bengal in India; and eastern Nepal.

== In culture ==
Various names by which the plant is known by include: phdau chhvèang, phdau chu:(r), Khmer (phdau=rattan).; korak, budum, Bangladesh.; lee-ren, Meitei, Manipur; golar, raiding, Adi language, Arunuchal Pradesh; korak bet, horna bet, India.

The fruit are eaten in Cambodia. In the same country the canes are regarded as flexible and strong, and are much appreciated for basket making. One of the many ingredients of Singju (prepared mainly of green vegetables with other plant parts like inflorescences and flowers, seeds, roots, rhizomes, etc., along with [non-vegetarian] or without [vegetarian] fermented dry fish, Ngari), the Meitei people of Manipur use the young shoots, which can sell for 10-15 Rupees for a bunch of 3-5 young shoots in the local markets. In Arunuchal Pradesh, the stems and fruit are eaten raw and are sold in markets. In India the rattan is characterized as moderately strong, and is used for making rough baskets, walking sticks, and furniture frames, with the split canes used for weaving chair bottoms.
