= Calamus bousigonii =

Scientific classification
- Kingdom: Plantae
- Clade: Tracheophytes
- Clade: Angiosperms
- Clade: Monocots
- Clade: Commelinids
- Order: Arecales
- Family: Arecaceae
- Genus: Calamus
- Species: C. bousigonii

Binomial name
- Calamus bousigonii Becc., Rec. Bot. Surv. India ii. 209 (1902)

Species of climbing palm from Asia

Calamus bousigonii, is a liana, a climbing plant, and part of the Arecaceae, or palm, family. It is a member of the subfamily Calamoideae, whose members are usually called rattans in English,

== Taxonomy ==
This species, Calamus bousigonii Becc., has 2 subspecies, Calamus bousigonii subsp. bousigonii and Calamus bousigonii subsp. smitinandii J.Dransf., Kew Bull. 55(3): 713 (2000) The subspecies smitinandii "is named for Tem Smitinand (1920–95), Thai botanist extraordinary, who often gave me much encouragement in my studies of Thai palms", John Dransfield (Note: please see Trias, Uncifera, Dipterocarpaceae, Smilax glabra, Gaultheria and Gastrochilus for some contributions to botany by Smitinand referenced on Wikipedia) This page will discuss the species, but note subspecies differences.

== Common names ==
The plant's names include wai huadio (Thailand), phdau aré:ch or phdav arech (phdau=rattan, Khmer), and may cun (may is common to rattan species, Vietnam) The smitinandii subspecies is called wai sae ma (หวายแซ่ม้า) in Trang Province, southern Thailand.

== Distribution ==
The species grows in Thailand, Cambodia and southern Vietnam, and possibly northern peninsular Malaysia. The subspecies bousigonii is recorded the same, however Dransfield regards the population in peninsular Thailand (and presumably that in Malaysia) as the smitinandii subspecies. The conservation status of the species is unknown, however the population in peninsular Thailand is probably not threatened.

== Ecology ==
The species grows in evergreen forest, where it has stems that yield cane from 5 to 15 m long. Occurring in the stunted-forest community, called forêt sempervirente basse de montagne by Pauline Dy Phon, in Bokor National Park, Kampot Province, Cambodia, the climber grows at elevations up to 1014 m. In Bạch Mã National Park, central Vietnam, which predominantly has tropical and subtropical monsoon evergreen rainforest, it grows at elevations from 400 to 1000 m, in areas of 50–60% forest cover. Locally the species is called ‘alone-rattan’ or ‘faithful-rattan’ because if a plant of one sex is found then a plant of the opposite sex will be nearby. The single-stemmed (not clumping) plant grows to 5–6 m in the park, and is noted for its big parallelogram-shaped leaf, with a wrinkled surface and wavy border. Subspecies bousigonii has rachis bracts that are strictly tubular and for the most part intact, not splitting, and the first order branches are inserted at the mouth of the bracts. The smitinandii subspecies is "one of the most attractive of all Thai rattans ... glossy undulate diamond-shaped leaflets and its neat low habit give it considerable horticultural potential[, a]mong Thai species it is very distinctive." John Dransfield. Subspecies smitinandii is a slender rattan, clustering and growing up to 10 m, rarely to 20 m, it often flowers and fruits at 2–3 m. Its stems without sheaves are 4–8 mm in diameter. The leaf sheath is densely covered in solitary spines, 1–13 mm long. The bracts on the smitinandii rachis are elongate, split for at least half their length, opening out and becoming flattened and tattering; first order branches are inserted about halfway along length of the bracts. In peninsular Malaysia, Calamus species have different flowering seasons, a mechanism to maintain reproductive barriers or to divide pollinator resources, C. bousigonii has peak flowering in November–December.

== Uses ==
Basket making is carried on using the long cane from this palm in Cambodia. The rattan is collected for local use in Bạch Mã National Park, Vietnam, where the height the palms grow to demonstrates that overharvesting is not occurring. The people in the buffer-zone of the park use rattan locally for traditional uses (construction, weaving, home-products), but it is also sold and traded, providing the second-most important source of income for poor and landless households (rice is the most important), while the majority of households use it as an income source. There has been overexploitation of rattan sources in the area.
