= Calamus poilanei =

Scientific classification
- Kingdom: Plantae
- Clade: Tracheophytes
- Clade: Angiosperms
- Clade: Monocots
- Clade: Commelinids
- Order: Arecales
- Family: Arecaceae
- Genus: Calamus
- Species: C. poilanei

Binomial name
- Calamus poilanei Conrard

Species of palm

Calamus poilanei is an Asian species of tropical forest rattan liana in the family Arecaceae. Its native range is Thailand, Laos, central and southern Vietnam and no subspecies are listed. Its name in Vietnamese is (mây) song bột, wai nampung in Thailand and wai khom or wai thoon in Laos.

== Use and conservation status ==
Calamus poilanei is considered "of high conservation concern and listed as threatened". Although relatively widespread within the region, deforestation and high harvesting pressure has caused the collapse of many populations in Laos, where it is the most economically important rattan. Stem harvesting is the main threat, but the (edible) shoot harvesting may threaten some remnant populations. Its solitary habit hinders regeneration and intensive harvest has resulted in very few remaining mature fruiting stems.
