= Ceratispa pinangae =

Scientific classification
- Kingdom: Animalia
- Phylum: Arthropoda
- Clade: Pancrustacea
- Class: Insecta
- Order: Coleoptera
- Suborder: Polyphaga
- Infraorder: Cucujiformia
- Family: Chrysomelidae
- Genus: Ceratispa
- Species: C. pinangae

Binomial name
- Ceratispa pinangae Gressitt, 1960

Species of beetle

Ceratispa pinangae is a species of beetle of the family Chrysomelidae. It is found on Biak.

== Description ==
Adults reach a length of about 10.9 mm. They are reddish ochraceous. The elytral disc is pale brown, ochraceous apically and at the extreme base and along the suture.

== Life history ==
The recorded host plants for this species are Pinanga species.
