= Aspidispa nigritarsis =

Scientific classification
- Kingdom: Animalia
- Phylum: Arthropoda
- Class: Insecta
- Order: Coleoptera
- Suborder: Polyphaga
- Infraorder: Cucujiformia
- Family: Chrysomelidae
- Genus: Aspidispa
- Species: A. nigritarsis

Binomial name
- Aspidispa nigritarsis Gestro, 1890

Species of beetle

Aspidispa nigritarsis is a species of beetle of the family Chrysomelidae. It is found in Papua New Guinea.

== Life history ==
No host plant has been documented for this species.
