= Ceratispa brandti =

Scientific classification
- Kingdom: Animalia
- Phylum: Arthropoda
- Clade: Pancrustacea
- Class: Insecta
- Order: Coleoptera
- Suborder: Polyphaga
- Infraorder: Cucujiformia
- Family: Chrysomelidae
- Genus: Ceratispa
- Species: C. brandti

Binomial name
- Ceratispa brandti Gressitt, 1960

Species of beetle

Ceratispa brandti is a species of beetle of the family Chrysomelidae. It is found on Normanby Island.

== Description ==
Adults reach a length of about 10.9 mm (males) and 11.8 mm (females). They are black above, but slightly reddish at the apex of the cephalic process and the extreme apex of the elytra.

== Life history ==
The recorded host plants for this species are palms (Arecaceae).
