= Aspidispa striata =

Scientific classification
- Kingdom: Animalia
- Phylum: Arthropoda
- Clade: Pancrustacea
- Class: Insecta
- Order: Coleoptera
- Suborder: Polyphaga
- Infraorder: Cucujiformia
- Family: Chrysomelidae
- Genus: Aspidispa
- Species: A. striata

Binomial name
- Aspidispa striata Gressitt, 1963

Species of beetle

Aspidispa striata is a species of beetle of the family Chrysomelidae. It is found in north-eastern and north-western New Guinea.

== Description ==
Adults reach a length of about 3.6–4.2 mm. They are ochraceous to pitchy brown, with the elytra are pitchy brown with two pale costae.

== Life history ==
The recorded host plants for this species are palms and rattan (Arecaceae).
