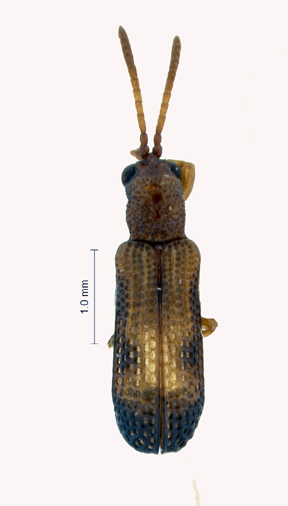
- Enischnispa calamivora

Scientific classification
- Kingdom: Animalia
- Phylum: Arthropoda
- Clade: Pancrustacea
- Class: Insecta
- Order: Coleoptera
- Suborder: Polyphaga
- Infraorder: Cucujiformia
- Family: Chrysomelidae
- Subfamily: Cassidinae
- Tribe: Coelaenomenoderini
- Genus: Enischnispa; Gressitt, 1957

= Enischnispa =

Genus of leaf beetles

Enischnispa is a genus of beetles belonging to the family Chrysomelidae.

== Species ==
- Enischnispa calamella Gressitt, 1990
- Enischnispa calamivora Gressitt, 1957
- Enischnispa daemonoropa Gressitt, 1963
- Enischnispa palmicola Gressitt, 1963
- Enischnispa rattana Gressitt, 1960
