= Aspidispa bicolor =

Scientific classification
- Kingdom: Animalia
- Phylum: Arthropoda
- Clade: Pancrustacea
- Class: Insecta
- Order: Coleoptera
- Suborder: Polyphaga
- Infraorder: Cucujiformia
- Family: Chrysomelidae
- Genus: Aspidispa
- Species: A. bicolor

Binomial name
- Aspidispa bicolor Gressitt, 1963

Species of beetle

Aspidispa bicolor is a species of beetle of the family Chrysomelidae. It is found in north-western and north-eastern New Guinea.

== Description ==
Adults reach a length of about 4–5.2 mm. The head, pronotum and scutellum are orange testaceous, while the elytra are dark purplish brown, but somewhat paler on the outer borders.

== Life history ==
The recorded host plant for this species is Korthalsia beccarii. The larvae and pupae have also been described. The larvae are pale testaceous, but reddish on the anterior portion and borders and sutures of the head capsule. They reach a length of about 7.4 mm. The pupae are yellowish ochraceous and reach a length of about 5.6 mm.
