= Ceratispa furcirostris =

Scientific classification
- Kingdom: Animalia
- Phylum: Arthropoda
- Clade: Pancrustacea
- Class: Insecta
- Order: Coleoptera
- Suborder: Polyphaga
- Infraorder: Cucujiformia
- Family: Chrysomelidae
- Genus: Ceratispa
- Species: C. furcirostris

Binomial name
- Ceratispa furcirostris Gressitt, 1963

Species of beetle

Ceratispa furcirostris is a species of beetle of the family Chrysomelidae. It is found in south-eastern New Guinea.

== Description ==
Adults reach a length of about 9-13 mm. The head is pale testaceous with two brown spots and the antennae are bluish ochraceous basally, gradually becoming brighter red and then slightly pitchy red apically. The elytra are testaceous with two brighter yellowish costae and a dull reddish brown sutural stripe, as well as a humeral stripe which is partly pitchy and partly reddish brown.

== Life history ==
The recorded host plants for this species are small palms (Arecaceae).
