= Calamus godefroyi =

Conservation status
- Near Threatened (IUCN 3.1)

Scientific classification
- Kingdom: Plantae
- Clade: Tracheophytes
- Clade: Angiosperms
- Clade: Monocots
- Clade: Commelinids
- Order: Arecales
- Family: Arecaceae
- Genus: Calamus
- Species: C. godefroyi

Binomial name
- Calamus godefroyi Becc., Ann. Roy. Bot. Gard. (Calcutta) 11(1): 267 (1908)

Species of palm

Part of a group, the subfamily Calamoideae, whose members are usually called rattans in English, Calamus godefroyi, is a climbing plant, and part of the Arecaceae, or palm, family.

It is native to Cambodia, central Laos and northeast Thailand, and possibly southern Vietnam.

Calamus godefroyi grows as a liana with an ascending stalk, sometimes climbing, up to 30m long. It grows near rivers in Cambodia, it is described as occurring in marshy, forested areas below 200m. It is distinguished from other Calamus species by having petioles less than 3 cm, the lowest pair of leaflets are often reflexed across the stem, and almost naked on faces, while the newly emerged leaflets have abaxial weak whitish indumentum. As well, the female partial inflorescences are short and stiffly curved. The conservation status of the species is regarded as unknown, but there are strong concerns of the population in Laos as the species occupies a habitat especially vulnerable to clearance because of agricultural intensification. There may be populations at Tonle Sap, Cambodia, which would ensure a secure population, but it not there is moderate concern.

The plant is known by various names, including phdau tük (Khmer, phdau=rattan), wai nong (Lao), mak vai (Luang Namtha Province, Laos) and wai nam (หวายน้ำ) (Nong Khai, Thailand).

The trunk/cane of the plant is used for mat and furniture making in Cambodia. Elsewhere the stem is used for handicrafts, and the shoot is eaten. The fruit is eaten in the mountainous areas of Luang Namtha Province, northwest Laos, where it is collected from primary forest.
