= Ceratispa meijerei =

Scientific classification
- Kingdom: Animalia
- Phylum: Arthropoda
- Clade: Pancrustacea
- Class: Insecta
- Order: Coleoptera
- Suborder: Polyphaga
- Infraorder: Cucujiformia
- Family: Chrysomelidae
- Genus: Ceratispa
- Species: C. meijerei

Binomial name
- Ceratispa meijerei (Weise, 1911)

Synonyms
- Xiphispa meijerei Weise, 1911

Species of beetle

Ceratispa meijerei is a species of beetle of the family Chrysomelidae. It is found on Biak and Waigeo.

== Life history ==
The recorded host plants for this species are palms (Arecaceae).
