= Enischnispa palmicola =

Scientific classification
- Kingdom: Animalia
- Phylum: Arthropoda
- Clade: Pancrustacea
- Class: Insecta
- Order: Coleoptera
- Suborder: Polyphaga
- Infraorder: Cucujiformia
- Family: Chrysomelidae
- Genus: Enischnispa
- Species: E. palmicola

Binomial name
- Enischnispa palmicola Gressitt, 1963

Species of beetle

Enischnispa palmicola is a species of beetle of the family Chrysomelidae. It is found in south-eastern New Guinea.

== Description ==
Adults reach a length of about 4.3 mm. The dorsum is blackish, with some short yellow streaks on the elytra.

== Biology ==
The recorded food plants are Arecaceae species.
