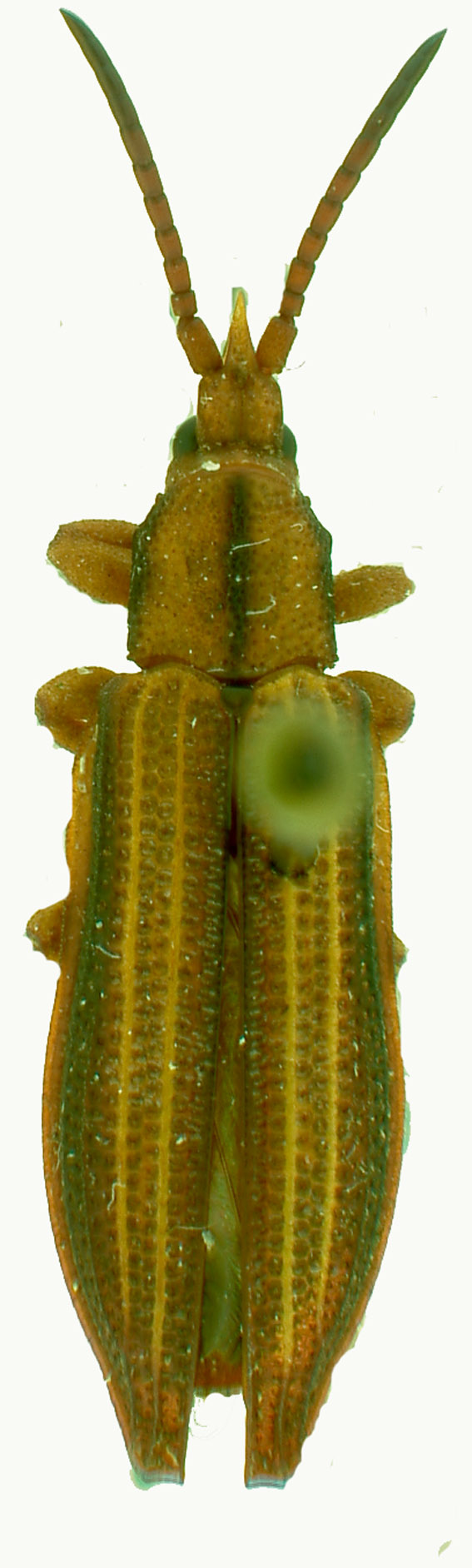

Scientific classification
- Kingdom: Animalia
- Phylum: Arthropoda
- Clade: Pancrustacea
- Class: Insecta
- Order: Coleoptera
- Suborder: Polyphaga
- Infraorder: Cucujiformia
- Family: Chrysomelidae
- Genus: Ceratispa
- Species: C. biroi

Binomial name
- Ceratispa biroi Gestro, 1897

Synonyms
- Xiphispa papuana Weise, 1909; Xiphispa weisei Gestro, 1913

= Ceratispa biroi =

Species of beetle

Ceratispa biroi is a species of beetle of the family Chrysomelidae. It is found in western and northern New Guinea.

== Life history ==
The recorded host plants for this species are Areca catechu, Metroxylon, Areca, Pandanus and Freycinetia species. The immature stages take place between the petiole-bases and main stems of the host plants. Adults feed on the undersides of new fronds. The larvae have also been described. They reach a length of about 12.5 mm.
