= Calamus calospathus =

Scientific classification
- Kingdom: Plantae
- Clade: Tracheophytes
- Clade: Angiosperms
- Clade: Monocots
- Clade: Commelinids
- Order: Arecales
- Family: Arecaceae
- Genus: Calamus
- Species: C. calospathus

Binomial name
- Calamus calospathus (Ridl.) W.J.Baker & J.Dransf.

Synonyms
- Calospatha confusa Furtado; Calospatha scortechinii Becc.; Daemonorops calospatha Ridl.

Species of palms

Calamus calospathus is a rare species of flowering plant in the palm family found in peninsular Malaysia, where it is referred to as rotan demuk. It is not common in collections, nor has it been found in the wild for several years, leading some to conclude that the species may have become extinct. Under the synonym Calospatha scortechinii, it has been regarded as the sole species in the genus Calospatha. The epithet calospatha is a combination of two Greek words meaning 'beautiful' and 'spathe'.

== Description ==
Calamus calospathus plants are solitary-trunked and covered in leaf scars, which exude a yellow gum after leaf loss. The linear leaflets are pinnately arranged and once-folded with toothed margins. The petioles and rachises feature recurved spines which hook onto vegetation and assist them in climbing. The inflorescences in both species consist of close, overlapping bracts from which male or female flowers emerge. The bracts are armed with spines and the inflorescence resembles those in Heliconia species. The small, round fruit, regarded as a delicacy by the Temuan aborigines, are scaly and usually contain three seeds.
