= Calamus compsostachys =

Conservation status
- Critically Endangered (IUCN 3.1)

Scientific classification
- Kingdom: Plantae
- Clade: Tracheophytes
- Clade: Angiosperms
- Clade: Monocots
- Clade: Commelinids
- Order: Arecales
- Family: Arecaceae
- Genus: Calamus
- Species: C. compsostachys

Binomial name
- Calamus compsostachys Burret

Species of plant

Calamus compsostachys is a species of flowering plant in the family Arecaceae. It is found only in China (Guangdong and Guangxi). Its natural habitats are subtropical or tropical dry forests and subtropical or tropical moist lowland forests.

Calamus compsostachys is threatened by habitat loss.
