= Enischnispa calamella =

Scientific classification
- Kingdom: Animalia
- Phylum: Arthropoda
- Clade: Pancrustacea
- Class: Insecta
- Order: Coleoptera
- Suborder: Polyphaga
- Infraorder: Cucujiformia
- Family: Chrysomelidae
- Genus: Enischnispa
- Species: E. calamella

Binomial name
- Enischnispa calamella Gressitt, 1990

Species of beetle

Enischnispa calamella is a species of beetle of the family Chrysomelidae. It is found in Papua New Guinea.

== Description ==
Adults reach a length of about 2.9-3 mm. The dorsum is dark reddish fuscous, while the inner disc of the elytron has an ochraceous area interrupted by a fuscescent band. The antennae are orangish and the legs are pale yellow-testaceous.

== Biology ==
The recorded food plants are Rattan species.
