= Aspidispa palmella =

Scientific classification
- Kingdom: Animalia
- Phylum: Arthropoda
- Clade: Pancrustacea
- Class: Insecta
- Order: Coleoptera
- Suborder: Polyphaga
- Infraorder: Cucujiformia
- Family: Chrysomelidae
- Genus: Aspidispa
- Species: A. palmella

Binomial name
- Aspidispa palmella Gressitt, 1960

Species of beetle

Aspidispa palmella is a species of beetle of the family Chrysomelidae. It is found in northern New Guinea.

== Description ==
Adults reach a length of about 4.7-5 mm. They are bright shiny red, with the apical two-fifths of the elytral disc pitchy black.

== Life history ==
The recorded host plants for this species are palms and rattan (Arecaceae). The pupae have also been described. They are yellowish testaceous, with pitchy black eyes.
