= Calamus dumetosus =

Scientific classification
- Kingdom: Plantae
- Clade: Tracheophytes
- Clade: Angiosperms
- Clade: Monocots
- Clade: Commelinids
- Order: Arecales
- Family: Arecaceae
- Subfamily: Calamoideae
- Tribe: Calameae
- Genus: Calamus
- Species: C. dumetosus

Binomial name
- Calamus dumetosus (J. Dransf.) A.J.Hend. & Floda

Genus of palms

Calamus dumetosus, synonym Retispatha dumetosa, is a species of flowering plant in the palm family endemic to Borneo, where it is rare and known as wi tebu bruang (dialectal: wi tebi bagadap) or 'the bear's sugar cane'. The specific epithet dumetosus means 'bushy'. As Retispatha dumetosa it was the only species in the genus Retispatha. While classified with other rattans, it retains only superficial climbing organs; it sprawls and leans but is not a true climber.

== Description ==
The clustering trunks are extensively armed with spines, 6 – 8 cm wide, closely ringed, with aerial roots at lower leaf nodes. The pinnate leaf is borne on a well-developed and armed petiole, the sheath and rachis also whorled with spines and covered in tomentum. The linear leaflets are regularly arranged with one fold, margins are toothed, and the midrib is prominent.

On flowering, the inflorescence in male plants is branched to three orders, in females to one, rarely two. The prophyll is large, splitting and becoming tattered, and armed with pseudo-whorls of black spines. Peduncular bracts are not present in the genus, the first order branches bear distichous, unarmed tubular bracts with fibrous limbs which subtend or wholly enclose, in the staminate spike, the second order branch system. These are subtended by tubular, membranous bracts, the third order rachillae have similar bracts subtending solitary staminate flowers.

The staminate flowers are tiny with a tubular calyx divided into three hairy, triangular lobes. The corolla is basally tubular and twice as long as the calyx, divided into three lobes, striate and valvate. There are six stamens with laterally connate filaments and oblong to ovate anthers, dorsifixed towards the base. The pollen is circular to elliptical and monosulcate; exine reticulate and tectate and irregularly spotted with striate spines; the tiny pistillode is trifid.

In female plants the inflorescence usually features one main branch and the branchlets may grow from the main axil, the branch, or both. The branchlets are subtended by netlike bracts, often enclosing them, each small branch bearing up to 20 pistillate flowers, each flower held in two distinct bracteoles. A sterile staminate flower is usually absent. The pistillate flowers are larger, calyx similar, with six staminodes. The filaments are joined to form a tube, the empty anthers flattened, gynoecium ovular, trioculate and scaly. There are three conspicuous fleshy stigmas, reflexed, with a basally attached ovule. The beaked fruit is ovoid to pear shaped, covered in reflexed scales, with a thin mesocarp. Each fruit carries one basally attached seed with a basal embryo.

== Taxonomy ==
The species was originally described as Retispatha dumetosa by John Dransfield in 1980. It was the only species in the genus Retispatha. Despite bearing strong resemblance to members of the Plectocomiinae, in preparing illustrations for the palm survey Genera Palmarum, Marion Sheehan discovered a single sterile, staminate flower among the pistillate members. The absence of such a flower previously obscured its relationship with the Calaminae, which it also closely resembles. This find, despite its rarity, seems to confirm its placement in the Calaminae subtribe. In 2015, the species was transferred to Calamus.

== Distribution and habitat ==
Calamus dumetosus is scattered across Borneo forming dense patches in hills and valleys of Dipterocarp forests, absent from the montane and heath varieties. No local uses have been recorded.
