= Calamus salicifolius =

Conservation status
- Least Concern (IUCN 3.1)

Scientific classification
- Kingdom: Plantae
- Clade: Tracheophytes
- Clade: Angiosperms
- Clade: Monocots
- Clade: Commelinids
- Order: Arecales
- Family: Arecaceae
- Genus: Calamus
- Species: C. salicifolius

Binomial name
- Calamus salicifolius Becc., Rec. Bot. Surv. India ii. 206 (1902)

Synonyms
- Calamus salicifolius var. leiophyllus Becc.

Species of palm

Native to south Vietnam and Cambodia, Calamus salicifolius, is commonly referred to as a rattan, it is one of many Calamus species of the Arecaceae, or palm, family. It is described as a little bushy plant, often climbing, even on itself, with a 2 to 4 m long stalk. It is found in deforested/severely degraded lowland areas and near houses, growing well in grasslands, scrub, roadside verges, ricefield bunds and peri-urban wastelands. Typically it occurs in floodplains with seasonal shallow flooding (or even deep, such as at Tonle Sap).

Its conservation status is that of "least concern".

In Cambodia, vernacular names in Khmer include phdau rôpèak (phdau=rattan), rôpèak, ro peak, and robak (late 19th/early 20th Century).

The fruits are eaten in Cambodia, but mostly by children. Cane from the stems is used in basket making. From a commercial perspective, in Kampong Thom Province canes from the plant are highly available, but with low market value. Its roots are used in traditional medicine in purgatives and to treat hypertension, they are also used to treat horses. Some present-day traditional healers in the Phnom Penh area describe the root and stem as having psah qualities, being able to quickly and efficiently heal infections, wounds, burns and repair internal and external tissue damage. The plant is also mentioned in an end-of-19th-Century/beginning-of-20th-Century Khmer medical text, the neh tāmmrap kpuon thnāmm kae' rog dan 4 (Here is the Medical Treatise to Cure the four [types of] Diseases), as part of a preparation to cure cerebral palsy.
