= Ceratispa wilsoni =

Scientific classification
- Kingdom: Animalia
- Phylum: Arthropoda
- Clade: Pancrustacea
- Class: Insecta
- Order: Coleoptera
- Suborder: Polyphaga
- Infraorder: Cucujiformia
- Family: Chrysomelidae
- Genus: Ceratispa
- Species: C. wilsoni

Binomial name
- Ceratispa wilsoni Gressitt, 1963

Species of beetle

Ceratispa wilsoni is a species of beetle of the family Chrysomelidae. It is found in north-western New Guinea.

== Description ==
Adults reach a length of about 11–13.6 mm. They are pale orange testaceous to blackish. The pronotum is pale ochraceous and the elytra are dark reddish at the apex.

== Life history ==
The recorded host plant for this species is rattan.
