= Aspidispa rotanica =

Scientific classification
- Kingdom: Animalia
- Phylum: Arthropoda
- Class: Insecta
- Order: Coleoptera
- Suborder: Polyphaga
- Infraorder: Cucujiformia
- Family: Chrysomelidae
- Genus: Aspidispa
- Species: A. rotanica

Binomial name
- Aspidispa rotanica Gressitt, 1963

Species of beetle

Aspidispa rotanica is a species of beetle of the family Chrysomelidae. It is found in north-western New Guinea and Yapen.

== Description ==
Adults reach a length of about 3.6-4.2 mm. They are orange testaceous to bluish black, with the head, pronotum and scutellum ochraceous and the elytra bluish black, with a purplish brown tinge at the side and apex.

== Life history ==
The recorded host plant for this species is rattan (Arecaceae).
