= Aspidispa lata =

Scientific classification
- Kingdom: Animalia
- Phylum: Arthropoda
- Clade: Pancrustacea
- Class: Insecta
- Order: Coleoptera
- Suborder: Polyphaga
- Infraorder: Cucujiformia
- Family: Chrysomelidae
- Genus: Aspidispa
- Species: A. lata

Binomial name
- Aspidispa lata Gressitt, 1963

Species of beetle

Aspidispa lata is a species of beetle of the family Chrysomelidae. It is found in north-western New Guinea.

== Description ==
Adults reach a length of about 3.5-4 mm. They are orange ochraceous to shiny black, while the elytra are shiny black with a faint bluish to greenish tinge on the basal two-thirds, but ochraceous on the remainder.

== Life history ==
The recorded host plant for this species is Rattan (Arecaceae).
