= Aspidispa pinangae =

Scientific classification
- Kingdom: Animalia
- Phylum: Arthropoda
- Class: Insecta
- Order: Coleoptera
- Suborder: Polyphaga
- Infraorder: Cucujiformia
- Family: Chrysomelidae
- Genus: Aspidispa
- Species: A. pinangae

Binomial name
- Aspidispa pinangae Gressitt, 1963

Species of beetle

Aspidispa pinangae is a species of beetle of the family Chrysomelidae. It is found in north-western New Guinea.

== Description ==
Adults reach a length of about 4 mm. They are pale ochraceous to blackish with a bluish tinge.

== Life history ==
The recorded host plants for this species are Pinanga species and rattan (Arecaceae).
