= Korthalsia minor =

Scientific classification
- Kingdom: Plantae
- Clade: Tracheophytes
- Clade: Angiosperms
- Clade: Monocots
- Clade: Commelinids
- Order: Arecales
- Family: Arecaceae
- Subfamily: Calamoideae
- Tribe: Calameae
- Genus: Korthalsia
- Species: K. minor

Binomial name
- Korthalsia minor A.J.Hend. & N.Q.Dung

Species of plant

Korthalsia minor is an Asian species of rattan plant in the family Arecaceae and the tribe Calameae. It has been recorded from Laos and Vietnam. The type locality is Cát Tiên National Park (altitude approx. 150 m) in Đồng Nai Province.
