= Aspidispa meijerei =

Scientific classification
- Kingdom: Animalia
- Phylum: Arthropoda
- Class: Insecta
- Order: Coleoptera
- Suborder: Polyphaga
- Infraorder: Cucujiformia
- Family: Chrysomelidae
- Genus: Aspidispa
- Species: A. meijerei

Binomial name
- Aspidispa meijerei (Weise, 1908)

Synonyms
- Agonia meijerei Weise, 1908

Species of beetle

Aspidispa meijerei is a species of beetle of the family Chrysomelidae. It is found in northern New Guinea.

== Life history ==
No host plant has been documented for this species.
