= Calamus deerratus =

Scientific classification
- Kingdom: Plantae
- Clade: Embryophytes
- Clade: Tracheophytes
- Clade: Angiosperms
- Clade: Monocots
- Clade: Commelinids
- Order: Arecales
- Family: Arecaceae
- Genus: Calamus
- Species: C. deerratus

Binomial name
- Calamus deerratus G.Mann & H.Wendl.

Species of flowering plant

Calamus deerratus is a dioecious rattan species within the family Arecaceae, it is widespread in Tropical Africa and it is the only species within the genus Calamus that is native to Tropical Africa.

== Description ==
Calamus deerratus is a clustering palm that can climb up to 20 m (66 ft). It grows in clumps with stems that are sometimes encircled by sheaths, the stems are between 15 and 20 cm (5.9 and 7.9 in) in length and 3–4 cm (1.2–1.6 in) in diameter. The leaves are pinnately compound in arrangement with tubular leaf sheaths that can reach up to 20 cm long, the sheaths are covered in dark brown to black flattended or triangular spines. The rachis is up to 180 cm long and covered in spines, while the ocrea is up to 10 cm long; the petiole can reach 20 cm in length and tends to have a flat surface above and a convex surface beneath, it is commonly covered in spines. Leaflets are lanceolate in outline, and are light to dark green in color. The flagellum is up to 4 cm long.

The fruit is brownish to orange when ripe, up to 4 cm long with an elliptic to oblong shape.

== Distribution and habitat ==
Occurs in Tropical Africa from Guinea to the Sudan and Southwards to Zambia. Found in seasonnally flooded forest areas.

== Uses ==
Canes obtained from the stem of Calamus deerratus are used in making ropes, sponges and baskets.
