= Caetano Xavier Furtado =

Botanist (1897–1980)

Caetano Xavier dos Remedios Furtado (14 October 1897 – 13 June 1980) was a botanist who specialized in palms. He worked at the Singapore botanical gardens. He described nearly 104 species of palms, worked on the African genus Hyphaene and on the family Araceae. The species Maxburretia furtadoana was named after him by John Dransfield in 1978. He was also involved in clarifying the terms "illegitimate" and "superfluous" names in taxonomic nomenclature. He also coined the word "basinym" which was modified as basionym.

== Early life ==
Furtado was born in Merces, Portuguese Goa. He was the son of physician Jose Irneu das Augustias dos Remedios and Maria Eloisa Anacleta de Sousa and went to the Poona Agricultural College, receiving a B.Ag. in 1921. He then went to British Burma as an agronomist and joined the Singapore Botanic Gardens in 1923. He received a D.Sc. from the University of Bombay in 1939. He knew Portuguese and English from early on and studied Italian so as to be able to read the works of Odoardo Beccari, as well as Spanish, French and German in order to read systematic literature.

== Career ==
Apart from palm taxonomy, he also wrote on matter of systematics and also wrote extensively including some biographical notes on I.H. Burkill.

== Personal life ==
Furtado's wife Ana Sebastiana da Piedade was from Calangute descent and they had 3 sons and 3 daughters.

== Legacy ==
The standard author abbreviation Furtado is used to indicate this person as the author when citing a botanical name.
