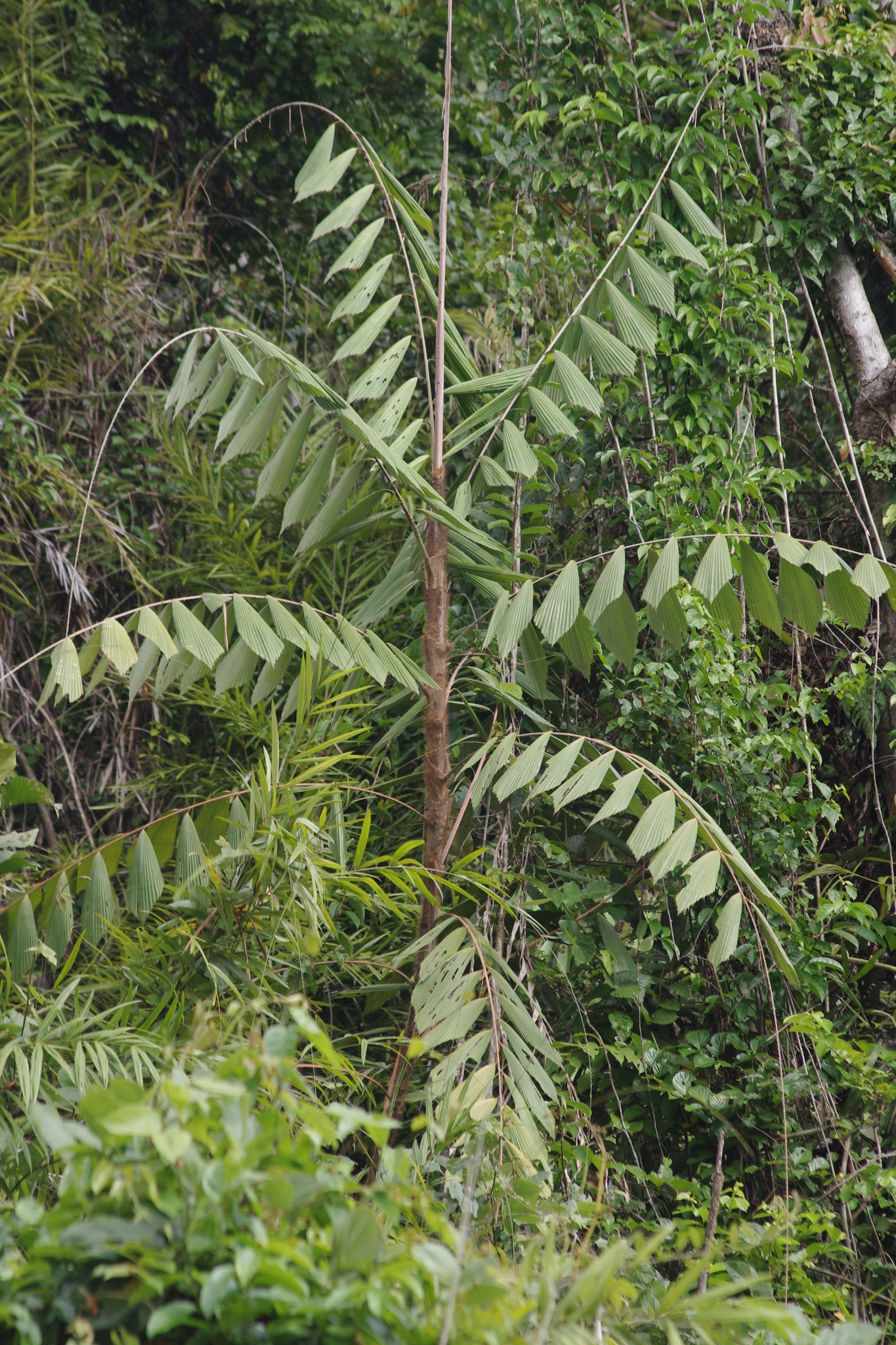
- Korthalsia zippelii

Scientific classification
- Kingdom: Plantae
- Clade: Embryophytes
- Clade: Tracheophytes
- Clade: Angiosperms
- Clade: Monocots
- Clade: Commelinids
- Order: Arecales
- Family: Arecaceae
- Subfamily: Calamoideae
- Tribe: Calameae
- Genus: Korthalsia; Blume

Species
- See text

Synonyms
- Calamosagus Griff.

= Korthalsia =

Genus of palms

Korthalsia is a clustering genus of flowering plant in the palm family Arecaceae spread throughout Southeast Asia. It is a highly specialized rattan with some species known to have an intimate relationship with ants, hence the common name ant rattan. High-climbing and armed with spines, the genus is named for the Dutch botanist Pieter Willem Korthals who first collected them in Indonesia.

== Description ==
In young plants the trunks, petioles and rachises are covered in spines. Mature plants typically lose rachis and petiole spines but will retain trunks spines in its new growth. The suckering stems are small to mostly moderate and are among the few in the palm family that branch; among rattans it is the only one with splitting stems. These splits are axil branching, and produce "vast aerial entanglements" The trunks are bare at the bottom but retain persistent leaf bases in its youngest parts; enlarged paper-like appendages, ocreas, form where the petioles meet the stem. The ocreas are usually grossly swollen and house ants. Younger leaves are undivided with the occasional bifid apice. A truly pinnate leaf form comes in maturity and is accompanied by a barbed rachis extension which allows the palm to hook onto forest vegetation and climb to the canopy top where mature pinnae hang pendent. Also unique to the group are the rachis borne stalks, adapted for climbing, from which the leaflets emerge.

Sexually, they are hapaxanthic, another rare feature in palms, which results in the death of individual stems after flowering and fruiting has occurred. As hermaphrodites, the flowers are also uncommon with both male and female organs present in each. The inflorescence is short and thick, once or twice branched, with bisexual flowers hanging from long, furry stalks. Spherical to ovoid, the fruit is scaly and matures to orange, red or brown with one basally attached seed.

Fossilized pollen referable to this genus has been recovered in upper Miocene deposits in northwest Borneo; its long history, and its wide variety of unusual features may indicate its climbing habit evolved independently of other rattans.

Bees are observed visitors to the flowers while the Oriental pied hornbill, Anthracoceros albirostris convexus feeds on the fruit.

== Species ==
As of February 2026, Plants of the World Online accepts the following 27 species:

- Korthalsia angustifolia Blume
- Korthalsia bejaudii Gagnep. ex Humbert
- Korthalsia celebica Becc.
- Korthalsia cheb Becc.
- Korthalsia concolor Burret
- Korthalsia debilis Blume
- Korthalsia echinometra Becc.
- Korthalsia ferox Becc.
- Korthalsia flagellaris Miq.
- Korthalsia furcata Becc.
- Korthalsia furtadoana J.Dransf.
- Korthalsia hispida Becc.
- Korthalsia jala J.Dransf.
- Korthalsia junghuhnii Miq.
- Korthalsia laciniosa (Griff.) Mart.
- Korthalsia lanceolata J.Dransf.
- Korthalsia merrillii Becc.
- Korthalsia minor A.J.Hend. & N.Q.Dung
- Korthalsia paucijuga Becc.
- Korthalsia rigida Blume
- Korthalsia robusta Blume
- Korthalsia rogersii Becc.
- Korthalsia rostrata Blume
- Korthalsia scaphigeroides Becc.
- Korthalsia scortechinii Becc.
- Korthalsia tenuissima Becc.
- Korthalsia zippelii Blume

== Distribution and habitat ==
The genus is concentrated around the Sunda Shelf's perhumid region with northern outliers in Indochina, the Andaman Islands and Burma east to Sulawesi and New Guinea. They are confined to low land or hilly tropical forest being conspicuously absent in mountain regions; some are narrowly limited to ultrabasic rock while others are adept at colonizing cleared forests.

=== Relationship with ants ===
Ants of the genus Camponotus have an intimate relationship with several Korthalsia species, occupying chambers in the fibrous and swollen ocreas at the leaf bases. Here, the ants "farm" scale insects which feed on the palm’s phloem cells, and produce a sweet dew the ants feed on. The ants also beat their abdomens against the dry leaf bases to create a precautionary alarm rattle before attacking en masse. The relationship seems to be mutual, protecting the palms from herbivores.

The carnivorous plant Nepenthes bicalcarata, as well as Macaranga caladiifolia and Clerodendrum fistulosum, grow alongside some Korthalsias in Borneo, and also feature swollen appendages in which ants nest. Other palm genera feature species known to harbour ants, including Laccosperma, Eremospatha and Calamus.

== Cultivation and uses ==
Their rarity in cultivation is likely due to their extreme spininess and their particular tropical needs. The stems and sheaths are made into rope, baskets and binding in house construction, but, unlike many other rattans they are irregularly knobby and scarred, which generally excludes their use in worked and polished furniture.
