= Daemonorops =

Historically recognized genus of palms

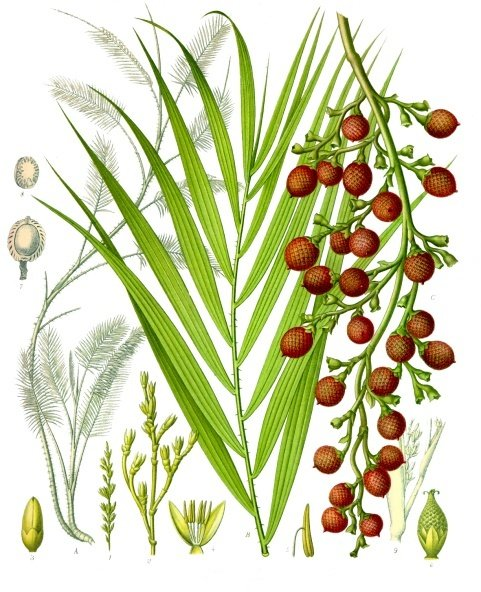
Calamus draco, syn. Daemonorops draco

Daemonorops was a genus of rattan palms in the family Arecaceae. Its species are now included within the genus Calamus. Species now placed in Daemonorops are dioecious, with male and female flowers on separate individuals. They are found primarily in the tropics and subtropics of southeastern Asia with a few species extending into southern China and the Himalayas.

Polysaccharides found in some former Daemonorops species are known for their medicinal anticoagulant properties. The resin of Daemonorops draco is known to contain a bitter-masking compound.

== Former species ==
Former species include:

- Daemonorops acamptostachys Becc. – Sarawak
- Daemonorops acehensis Rustiami – Sumatra
- Daemonorops affinis Becc. – Mindanao
- Daemonorops angustifolia (Griff.) Mart. – Thailand, Malaysia
- Daemonorops aruensis Becc. – Aru Islands
- Daemonorops asteracantha Becc. – Borneo
- Daemonorops atra J.Dransf. – Borneo
- Daemonorops aurea Renuka & Vijayak. – Andaman Islands
- Daemonorops banggiensis J.Dransf. – Sabah
- Daemonorops beguinii Burret – Maluku
- Daemonorops binnendijkii Becc. – Sumatra
- Daemonorops brachystachys Furtado – Sumatra, Malaysia
- Daemonorops brevicaulis A.J.Hend. & N.Q.Dung – Vietnam
- Daemonorops calapparia (Mart.) Blume – Maluku
- Daemonorops calicarpa (Griff.) Mart. – Sumatra, Malaysia
- Daemonorops clemensiana Becc. – Mindanao
- Daemonorops collarifera Becc. – Sarawak
- Daemonorops confusa Furtado – Sumatra
- Daemonorops crinita Blume – Sumatra, Kalimantan
- Daemonorops cristata Becc. – Sarawak
- Daemonorops curranii Becc. – Palawan
- Daemonorops depressiuscula (Miq. ex H.Wendl.) Becc . – Sumatra
- Daemonorops didymophylla Becc. – Thailand, Malaysia, Borneo, Sumatra
- Daemonorops draco (Willd.) Blume, dragon's blood palm – Thailand, Malaysia, Borneo, Sumatra. Synonymous with Calamus draco Willd.
- Daemonorops dracuncula Ridl. – Mentawai
- Daemonorops dransfieldii Rustiami – Sumatra
- Daemonorops elongata Blume – Borneo
- Daemonorops fissa Blume – Borneo
- Daemonorops fissilis (A.J.Hend., N.K.Ban & N.Q.Dung) A.J.Hend. – Vietnam
- Daemonorops forbesii Becc. – Sumatra
- Daemonorops formicaria Becc. – Borneo
- Daemonorops geniculata (Griff.) Mart. – Thailand, Malaysia, Sumatra
- Daemonorops gracilipes (Miq.) Becc. – Sumatra
- Daemonorops gracilis Becc. – Palawan
- Daemonorops grandis (Griff.) Mart. – Thailand, Malaysia = Calamus grandis
- Daemonorops hirsuta Blume – Malaysia, Borneo, Sumatra
- Daemonorops horrida Burret – Sumatra
- Daemonorops ingens J.Dransf. – Borneo
- Calamus jenkinsianus|Daemonorops jenkinsiana (Griff.) Mart. – Guangdong, Guangxi, Hainan, Taiwan, Bangladesh, Bhutan, Cambodia, India, Laos, Myanmar, Nepal, Thailand, Vietnam
- Daemonorops korthalsii Blume – Borneo
- Daemonorops kunstleri Becc. – Thailand, Malaysia
- Daemonorops kurziana Hook.f. ex Becc. – Thailand, Malaysia, Andaman Islands
- Daemonorops lamprolepis Becc. – Sulawesi
- Daemonorops leptopus (Griff.) Mart. – Thailand, Malaysia
- Daemonorops lewisiana (Griff.) Mart. – Thailand, Malaysia, Sumatra
- Daemonorops loheriana Becc. – Philippines
- Daemonorops longipes (Griff.) Mart. – Thailand, Malaysia, Sumatra, Borneo
- Daemonorops longispatha Becc. – Borneo
- Daemonorops longispinosa Burret – Sumatra
- Daemonorops longistipes Burret – Sabah, Sarawak
- Daemonorops macrophylla Becc. – Thailand, Malaysia
- Daemonorops macroptera (Miq.) Becc. – Sulawesi
- Daemonorops maculata J.Dransf. – Sarawak
- Daemonorops manii Becc. – Andaman Islands
- Daemonorops megalocarpa Burret – Sumatra
- Daemonorops melanochaetes Blume – Thailand, Malaysia, Sumatra, Java
- Daemonorops micracantha (Griff.) Becc. – Malaysia, Borneo
- Daemonorops microcarpa Burret – Sumatra
- Daemonorops microstachys Becc. – Borneo
- Daemonorops mirabilis (Mart.) Mart. – Kalimantan
- Daemonorops mogeana Rustiami – Sulawesi
- Daemonorops mollis (Blanco) Merr. – Philippines
- Daemonorops mollispina J.Dransf. – Vietnam
- Daemonorops monticola (Griff.) Mart. – Thailand, Malaysia
- Daemonorops nigra (Willd.) Blume – Maluku
- Daemonorops nuichuaensis (A.J.Hend., N.K.Ban & N.Q.Dung) A.J.Hend. – Vietnam
- Daemonorops oblata J.Dransf. – Borneo
- Daemonorops oblonga (Reinw. ex Blume) Blume – Java
- Daemonorops ochrolepis Becc. – Philippines
- Daemonorops ocreata A.J.Hend. & N.Q.Dung – Vietnam
- Daemonorops oligolepis Becc. – Mindanao
- Daemonorops oligophylla Becc. – Perak
- Daemonorops oxycarpa Becc. – Borneo
- Daemonorops pachyrostris Becc. – Kalimantan
- Daemonorops palembanica Blume – Sumatra
- Daemonorops pannosa Becc. – Mindanao
- Daemonorops pedicellaris Becc. – Leyte, Mindanao
- Daemonorops periacantha Miq. – Malaysia, Sumatra, Borneo
- Daemonorops plagiocycla Burret – Sumatra
- Daemonorops poilanei J.Dransf. – Vietnam
- Daemonorops polita Fernando – Mindanao
- Daemonorops pumila Van Valk. – Kalimantan
- Daemonorops rarispinosa Renuka & Vijayak. – Andaman Islands
- Daemonorops riedeliana (Miq.) Becc. – Sulawesi
- Daemonorops robusta Warb. ex Becc. – Sulawesi, Maluku
- Daemonorops rubra (Reinw. ex Mart.) Blume – Java
- Daemonorops ruptilis Becc. – Borneo
- Daemonorops sabut Becc. – Malaysia, Sumatra, Borneo, Thailand
- Daemonorops sarasinorum Warb. ex Becc. – Sulawesi
- Daemonorops scapigera Becc. – Johor, Borneo, Natuna Islands, Sumatra
- Daemonorops schlechteri Burret – Sulawesi
- Daemonorops sekundurensis Rustiami & Zumaidar – Sumatra
- Daemonorops sepal Becc. – Malaysia, Thailand
- Daemonorops serpentina J.Dransf. – Sabah
- Daemonorops siberutensis Rustiami – Siberut
- Daemonorops singalana Becc. – Sumatra
- Daemonorops sparsiflora Becc. – Borneo
- Daemonorops spectabilis Becc. – Borneo
- Daemonorops stenophylla Becc. – Sumatra
- Daemonorops takanensis Rustiami – Sulawesi
- Daemonorops treubiana Becc. – described 1911 from material collected in unknown location; probably extinct
- Daemonorops trichroa Miq. – Sumatra
- Daemonorops unijuga J.Dransf. – Sarawak
- Daemonorops urdanetana Becc. – Mindanao
- Daemonorops uschdraweitiana Burret – Sumatra
- Daemonorops verticillaris (Griff.) Mart. – Malaysia, Thailand, Sumatra
- Daemonorops wrightmyoensis Renuka & Vijayak. – Andaman Islands
