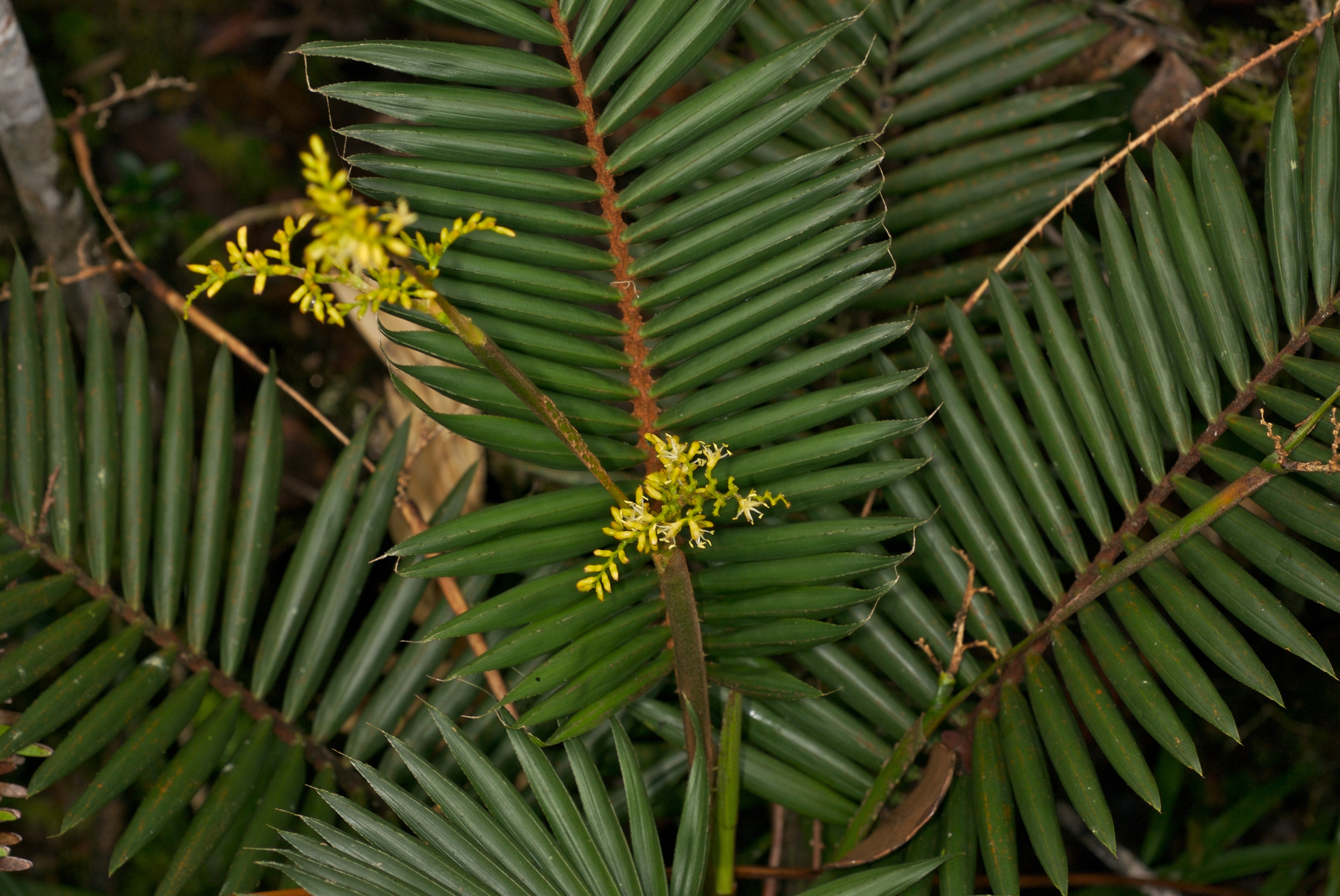
- Calamus gibbsianus

Scientific classification
- Kingdom: Plantae
- Clade: Tracheophytes
- Clade: Angiosperms
- Clade: Monocots
- Clade: Commelinids
- Order: Arecales
- Family: Arecaceae
- Subfamily: Calamoideae
- Tribe: Calameae
- Genus: Calamus; L.

Type species
- Calamus rotang L.

Species
- More than 400 – see text

Synonyms
- 11 Synonyms: Calospatha Becc.; Ceratolobus Blume ex Schult. & Schult.f.; Cornera Furtado; Daemonorops Blume; Palmijuncus Rumph. ex Kuntze; Pogonotium J.Dransf.; Retispatha J.Dransf.; Rotang Adans.; Rotanga Boehm.; Schizospatha Furtado; Zalaccella Becc.

= Calamus (palm) =

Genus of flowering plants

Calamus is a genus of flowering plants in the palm family Arecaceae, and is one of several genera known as rattan palms. There are an estimated 400 species in this genus, all native to tropical and subtropical Asia, Africa, and Australia.

== Description ==
Species in this genus are mostly climbers with long, slender, flexible stems, but some are erect shrubs and some have no apparent stem (acalescent). They may be clustering or single-stemmed. The leaves are pinnate with an even number of leaflets, in the climbers they may be variously barbed or clothed in spines (including the leaf sheath). Climbers also produce armed tendrils – either from the leaf sheath, in which case it is known as a 'flagellum', or as an extension of the midrib and known as a 'cirrus'. Climbing species will often reach the forest canopy, and one plant was recorded as being 185 m (607 ft) long. In some species, such as Calamus rudentum, the inflorescence also has a flagellum.

All species are dioecious, meaning that male and female inflorescences are produced on separate plants. They both arise from the leaf axils and are pendant and branched, and may variously have barbs, spines or cirri. The fruit rarely contain more than one globose seed, the thin sarcotesta is covered by an external layer made up of rows of small overlapping scales similar in appearance to a snakeskin.

== Taxonomy ==
Calamus is the sole genus in the subtribe Calaminae, tribe Calameae, subfamily Calamoideae. It includes over 400 species after the remaining genera of Calaminae (Daemonorops, Calospatha, Ceratolobus, Pogonotium and Retispatha) were subsumed within it in 2015, in preparation for a wide review of the genus. It is known to be non-monophyletic, and a reliable description of the genus is not possible due to a lack of uneqivocal synapomorphies.

== Distribution ==
The genus is distributed from Africa through southeast Asia and Australia to islands of the western Pacific. The bulk of the species occur in Asia, with one species in Africa (C. deerratus) and eight in Australia.

== Uses ==
Various species are used to produce the rattan cane for making furniture. Many species were also used in tribal cultures – Indigenous Australians used various parts for shelters, baskets, axe handles, fish traps and fishing lines, as well as eating the fruit and young shoots. Some species may have medicinal properties.

== Species ==
As of May 2025, Plants of the World Online recognises 416 species:

- Calamus acamptostachys (Becc.) W.J.Baker
- Calamus acanthochlamys J.Dransf.
- Calamus acanthophyllus Becc.
- Calamus acanthospathus Griff.
- Calamus acaulis A.J.Hend., N.K.Ban & N.Q.Dung
- Calamus adspersus Blume
- Calamus aidae Fernando
- Calamus albidus L.X.Guo & A.J.Hend.
- Calamus altiscandens Burret
- Calamus andamanicus Kurz
- Calamus anomalus Burret
- Calamus applanatus (A.J.Hend. & N.Q.Dung) A.J.Hend.
- Calamus arborescens Griff.
- Calamus aruensis Becc.
- Calamus arugda Becc.
- Calamus ashtonii J.Dransf.
- Calamus asperrimus Blume
- Calamus asteracanthus (Becc.) W.J.Baker
- Calamus ater (J.Dransf.) W.J.Baker
- Calamus australis Mart.
- Calamus axillaris Becc.
- Calamus bacularis Becc.
- Calamus badius J.Dransf. & W.J.Baker
- Calamus baiyerensis W.J.Baker & J.Dransf.
- Calamus balerensis Fernando
- Calamus balingensis Furtado
- Calamus banggiensis (J.Dransf.) W.J.Baker
- Calamus bankae W.J.Baker & J.Dransf.
- Calamus baratangensis Renuka & Vijayak.
- Calamus barbatus Zipp. ex Blume
- Calamus barfodii W.J.Baker & J.Dransf.
- Calamus barisanensis A.J.Hend.
- Calamus batanensis (Becc.) Baja-Lapis
- Calamus beccarii A.J.Hend.
- Calamus bicolor Becc.
- Calamus billitonensis Becc. ex K.Heyne
- Calamus bimaniferus T.Evans, Sengdala, Viengkham, Thamm. & J.Dransf.
- Calamus boniensis Becc. ex K.Heyne
- Calamus bousigonii Pierre ex Becc.
- Calamus brandisii Becc.
- Calamus brevicaulis (A.J.Hend. & N.Q.Dung) W.J.Baker
- Calamus brevissimus A.J.Hend.
- Calamus brunneus A.J.Hend., Pitopang & Moh.Iqbal
- Calamus bulubabi W.J.Baker & J.Dransf.
- Calamus burckianus Becc.
- Calamus burkillianus Becc. ex Ridl.
- Calamus caesius Blume
- Calamus calapparius Mart.
- Calamus calciphilus A.J.Hend.
- Calamus calicarpus Griff.
- Calamus calospathus (Ridl.) W.J.Baker & J.Dransf.
- Calamus capillosus W.J.Baker & J.Dransf.
- Calamus carsicola Adorador & Fernando
- Calamus caryotoides A.Cunn. ex Mart.
- Calamus castaneus Griff.
- Calamus caurinus A.J.Hend. & Rustiami
- Calamus centralis A.J.Hend., N.K.Ban & N.Q.Dung
- Calamus ceratophorus Conrard
- Calamus cheirophyllus J.Dransf. & W.J.Baker
- Calamus ciliaris Blume
- Calamus cinereus A.J.Hend. & N.Q.Dung
- Calamus clivorum A.J.Hend. & N.Q.Dung
- Calamus cockburnii J.Dransf.
- Calamus compsostachys Burret
- Calamus comptus J.Dransf.
- Calamus concinnus Mart.
- Calamus concolor (Blume) W.J.Baker
- Calamus confusus (Furtado) W.J.Baker
- Calamus conirostris Becc.
- Calamus conjugatus Furtado
- Calamus conspectus W.J.Baker
- Calamus convallium J.Dransf.
- Calamus crassifolius J.Dransf.
- Calamus crinitus (Blume) Miq.
- Calamus cristatus (Becc.) W.J.Baker
- Calamus croftii J.Dransf. & W.J.Baker
- Calamus cumingianus Becc.
- Calamus cuthbertsonii Becc.
- Calamus dasyacanthus W.J.Baker, Bayton, J.Dransf. & Maturb.
- Calamus deerratus G.Mann & H.Wendl.
- Calamus delicatulus Thwaites
- Calamus densifloropsis A.J.Hend.
- Calamus densiflorus Becc.
- Calamus depauperatus Ridl.
- Calamus dianbaiensis C.F.Wei
- Calamus didymocarpus Warb. ex Becc.
- Calamus diepenhorstii Miq.
- Calamus digitatus Becc.
- Calamus dilaceratus Becc.
- Calamus dioicus Lour.
- Calamus discolor Mart.
- Calamus disjunctus A.J.Hend.
- Calamus distentus Burret
- Calamus divaricatus Becc.
- Calamus divergens A.J.Hend., Pitopang & Moh.Iqbal
- Calamus dongnaiensis Pierre ex Becc.
- Calamus dracunculus (Ridl.) W.J.Baker
- Calamus dumetosus (J.Dransf.) A.J.Hend. & Floda
- Calamus egregius Burret
- Calamus elegans Becc. ex Ridl.
- Calamus erectus Roxb.
- Calamus erinaceus (Becc.) Becc.
- Calamus erioacanthus Becc.
- Calamus erythrocarpus W.J.Baker & J.Dransf.
- Calamus essigii W.J.Baker
- Calamus eugenei W.J.Baker
- Calamus evansii A.J.Hend.
- Calamus exiguus A.J.Hend.
- Calamus exilis Griff.
- Calamus fertilis Becc.
- Calamus filipendulus Becc.
- Calamus filispadix Becc.
- Calamus fissilis A.J.Hend., N.K.Ban & N.Q.Dung
- Calamus flabellatus Becc.
- Calamus flagellum Griff. ex Walp.
- Calamus floribundus Griff.
- Calamus formicarius (Becc.) W.J.Baker
- Calamus formosanus Becc.
- Calamus furvus A.J.Hend.
- Calamus gaharuensis A.J.Hend.
- Calamus gajoensis A.J.Hend. & Rustiami
- Calamus gamblei Becc.
- Calamus geniculatus Griff.
- Calamus gibbsianus Becc.
- Calamus glaucescens (Blume) D.Dietr.
- Calamus godefroyi Becc.
- Calamus gonospermus Becc.
- Calamus goramensis A.J.Hend.
- Calamus gracilipes Miq.
- Calamus gracilis Roxb.
- Calamus griseus J.Dransf.
- Calamus guruba Buch.-Ham. ex Mart.
- Calamus hallierianus (Becc. ex K.Heyne) W.J.Baker
- Calamus harmandii Pierre ex Becc.
- Calamus heatubunii W.J.Baker & J.Dransf.
- Calamus helferianus Kurz
- Calamus henryanus Becc.
- Calamus heteracanthopsis A.J.Hend.
- Calamus heteracanthus Zipp. ex Blume
- Calamus heteroideus Blume
- Calamus hirsutus (Blume) Miq.
- Calamus holttumii Furtado
- Calamus hookerianus Becc.
- Calamus horrens Blume
- Calamus hosensis A.J.Hend.
- Calamus hukaungensis A.J.Hend.
- Calamus impressus A.J.Hend., Pitopang & Moh.Iqbal
- Calamus inermis T.Anderson
- Calamus ingens (J.Dransf.) W.J.Baker
- Calamus inops Becc. ex K.Heyne
- Calamus insignis Griff.
- Calamus insolitus A.J.Hend.
- Calamus insularis A.J.Hend.
- Calamus interruptus Becc.
- Calamus jacobsii W.J.Baker & J.Dransf.
- Calamus javensis Blume
- Calamus johanis A.J.Hend.
- Calamus johndransfieldii W.J.Baker
- Calamus johnsii W.J.Baker & J.Dransf.
- Calamus kampucheaensis A.J.Hend. & Hourt
- Calamus kandariensis Becc.
- Calamus karuensis Ridl.
- Calamus katikii W.J.Baker & J.Dransf.
- Calamus kebariensis Maturb., J.Dransf. & W.J.Baker
- Calamus kinabaluensis A.J.Hend.
- Calamus kingianus Becc.
- Calamus kjellbergii Furtado
- Calamus klossii Ridl.
- Calamus kontumensis A.J.Hend., N.K.Ban & N.Q.Dung
- Calamus koordersianus Becc.
- Calamus kostermansii W.J.Baker & J.Dransf.
- Calamus kubahensis A.J.Hend.
- Calamus kunstleri (Becc.) W.J.Baker
- Calamus lakshmanae Renuka
- Calamus lambirensis J.Dransf.
- Calamus lamprolepis (Becc.) W.J.Baker
- Calamus laoensis T.Evans, Sengdala, Viengkham, Thamm. & J.Dransf.
- Calamus lateralis A.J.Hend., N.K.Ban & N.Q.Dung
- Calamus latifolius Roxb.
- Calamus latus A.J.Hend.
- Calamus lauterbachii Becc.
- Calamus laxissimus Ridl.
- Calamus leiocaulis Becc. ex K.Heyne
- Calamus leloi J.Dransf.
- Calamus lengguanii A.J.Hend.
- Calamus leptopus Griff.
- Calamus leptospadix Griff.
- Calamus leptostachys Becc. ex K.Heyne
- Calamus lobatus A.J.Hend., Pitopang & Moh.Iqbal
- Calamus lobbianus Becc.
- Calamus loherianus (Becc.) W.J.Baker
- Calamus longibracteatus W.J.Baker
- Calamus longipes Griff.
- Calamus longipinna K.Schum. & Lauterb.
- Calamus longisetus Griff.
- Calamus longispatha Ridl.
- Calamus longiusculus A.J.Hend.
- Calamus lucysmithiae W.J.Baker & J.Dransf.
- Calamus macrochlamys Becc.
- Calamus macropterus Miq.
- Calamus macrorhynchus Burret
- Calamus macrosphaerion Becc.
- Calamus maculatus (J.Dransf.) W.J.Baker
- Calamus mahanandensis S.Mondal, S.K.Basu & M.Chowdhury
- Calamus maiadum J.Dransf.
- Calamus malawaliensis J.Dransf.
- Calamus manan Miq.
- Calamus manglaensis A.J.Hend. & N.Q.Dung
- Calamus manillensis (Mart.) H.Wendl.
- Calamus marginatus (Blume) Mart. ex Walp.
- Calamus maturbongsii W.J.Baker & J.Dransf.
- Calamus megaphyllus Becc.
- Calamus meghalayensis A.J.Hend.
- Calamus melanacanthos Mart.
- Calamus melanochaetes (Blume) Miq.
- Calamus melanochrous Burret
- Calamus melanoloma Mart.
- Calamus melanorhynchus Becc.
- Calamus metzianus Schltdl.
- Calamus micracanthus Griff.
- Calamus micranthus Blume
- Calamus microsphaerion Becc.
- Calamus minahassae Warb. ex Becc.
- Calamus minor A.J.Hend.
- Calamus minutus J.Dransf.
- Calamus mirabilis Mart.
- Calamus mitis Becc.
- Calamus modestus T.Evans & T.P.Anh
- Calamus mogeae J.Dransf.
- Calamus mollispinus (J.Dransf.) W.J.Baker
- Calamus moorei (J.Dransf.) W.J.Baker
- Calamus moorhousei Furtado
- Calamus moseleyanus Becc.
- Calamus moszkowskianus Becc.
- Calamus moti F.M.Bailey
- Calamus muelleri H.Wendl.
- Calamus multispicatus Burret
- Calamus muricatus Becc.
- Calamus myriacanthus Becc.
- Calamus myrianthus Becc.
- Calamus nagbettai R.R.Fernandez & Dey
- Calamus nanduensis W.J.Baker & J.Dransf.
- Calamus nannostachys Burret
- Calamus nanodendron J.Dransf.
- Calamus nematospadix Becc.
- Calamus nicobaricus Becc.
- Calamus nielsenii J.Dransf.
- Calamus nitidus Mart.
- Calamus notabilis A.J.Hend.
- Calamus novae-georgii W.J.Baker & J.Dransf.
- Calamus nudus W.J.Baker & S.Venter
- Calamus nuichuaensis A.J.Hend., N.K.Ban & N.Q.Dung
- Calamus nuralievii A.J.Hend. & N.Q.Dung
- Calamus obiensis A.J.Hend.
- Calamus oblatus (J.Dransf.) W.J.Baker
- Calamus oblongus Reinw. ex Blume
- Calamus occidentalis Witono & J.Dransf.
- Calamus ochrolepis (Becc.) W.J.Baker
- Calamus ocreatus (A.J.Hend. & N.Q.Dung) W.J.Baker
- Calamus oligostachys T.Evans, Sengdala, Viengkham, Thamm. & J.Dransf.
- Calamus optimus Becc.
- Calamus oresbius W.J.Baker & J.Dransf.
- Calamus ornatus Blume
- Calamus ovoideus Thwaites ex Trimen
- Calamus oxleyanus Teijsm. & Binn. ex Miq.
- Calamus oxleyoides A.J.Hend.
- Calamus oxycarpus Becc.
- Calamus oxycoccus W.J.Baker
- Calamus pachypus W.J.Baker, Bayton, J.Dransf. & Maturb.
- Calamus pachystemonus Thwaites
- Calamus padangensis Furtado
- Calamus pahangensis A.J.Hend.
- Calamus pandanosmus Furtado
- Calamus papuanus Becc.
- Calamus parutan Fernando
- Calamus parvulus A.J.Hend. & N.Q.Dung
- Calamus paspalanthus Becc.
- Calamus paulii J.Dransf.
- Calamus pedicellaris (Becc.) W.J.Baker
- Calamus pedicellatus Becc. ex K.Heyne
- Calamus penicillatus Roxb.
- Calamus perakensis Becc.
- Calamus peregrinus Furtado
- Calamus periacanthus (Miq.) Miq.
- Calamus pertenuis A.J.Hend. & Rustiami
- Calamus pholidostachys J.Dransf. & W.J.Baker
- Calamus pilosellus Becc.
- Calamus pilosissimus Becc.
- Calamus pintaudii W.J.Baker & J.Dransf.
- Calamus platyspathus Mart. ex Kunth
- Calamus plicatus Blume
- Calamus poensis Becc.
- Calamus pogonacanthus Becc. ex H.J.P.Winkl.
- Calamus pogonotium W.J.Baker
- Calamus poilanei Conrard
- Calamus politus (Fernando) W.J.Baker
- Calamus polycladus Burret
- Calamus posoanus Rustiami
- Calamus powlingii A.J.Hend.
- Calamus praetermissus J.Dransf.
- Calamus propinquus (Becc.) A.J.Hend.
- Calamus pseudoconcolor (J.Dransf.) W.J.Baker
- Calamus pseudoerectus Sujit Mondal, S.K.Basu & M.Chowdhury
- Calamus pseudomollis Becc.
- Calamus pseudotenuis Becc.
- Calamus pseudozebrinus Burret
- Calamus psilocladus J.Dransf.
- Calamus pycnocarpus (Furtado) J.Dransf.
- Calamus pygmaeus Becc.
- Calamus quangngaiensis A.J.Hend. & N.Q.Dung
- Calamus radiatus Thwaites
- Calamus radicalis H.Wendl. & Drude
- Calamus radulosus Becc.
- Calamus reinwardtii Mart.
- Calamus reticulatus Burret
- Calamus retroflexus J.Dransf. & W.J.Baker
- Calamus rhabdocladus Burret
- Calamus rheedei Griff.
- Calamus rhomboideus Blume
- Calamus rhytidomus Becc.
- Calamus ridleyanus Becc.
- Calamus robinsonianus Becc.
- Calamus rotang L.
- Calamus ruber Reinw. ex Mart.
- Calamus rudentum Lour.
- Calamus rugosus Becc.
- Calamus rumphii Blume
- Calamus ruptilis (Becc.) W.J.Baker
- Calamus ruptiloides A.J.Hend.
- Calamus ruvidus Becc.
- Calamus sabalensis J.Dransf.
- Calamus salicifolius Becc.
- Calamus saltuensis A.J.Hend.
- Calamus samian Becc.
- Calamus sandsii Rustiami
- Calamus sarawakensis Becc.
- Calamus sashae J.Dransf. & W.J.Baker
- Calamus scabridulus Becc.
- Calamus scabrispathus Becc.
- Calamus scapigerus (Becc.) W.J.Baker
- Calamus schistoacanthus Blume
- Calamus schlechteri (Burret) W.J.Baker
- Calamus schlechterianus Becc.
- Calamus scipionum Lour.
- Calamus scleracanthus Becc. ex K.Heyne
- Calamus sedens J.Dransf.
- Calamus senalingensis J.Dransf.
- Calamus septimus A.J.Hend. & Rustiami
- Calamus seriatus A.J.Hend. & N.Q.Dung
- Calamus seropakensis A.J.Hend.
- Calamus serpentinus (J.Dransf.) W.J.Baker
- Calamus serrulatus Becc.
- Calamus sessiliflorus A.J.Hend. & Rustiami
- Calamus simplex Becc.
- Calamus siphonospathus Mart. ex Walp.
- Calamus smitinandii (J.Dransf.) A.J.Hend.
- Calamus sordidus J.Dransf.
- Calamus spanostachys W.J.Baker & J.Dransf.
- Calamus sparsiflorus (Becc.) W.J.Baker
- Calamus spectatissimus Furtado
- Calamus spiculifer J.Dransf. & W.J.Baker
- Calamus spinosus A.J.Hend., Pitopang & Moh.Iqbal
- Calamus spinulinervis Becc.
- Calamus spiralis A.J.Hend., N.K.Ban & N.Q.Dung
- Calamus suaveolens W.J.Baker & J.Dransf.
- Calamus subangulatus Miq.
- Calamus subsolanus A.J.Hend. & Rustiami
- Calamus sulawesiensis A.J.Hend.
- Calamus sumatranus (Becc.) A.J.Hend.
- Calamus superciliatus W.J.Baker & J.Dransf.
- Calamus susukensis A.J.Hend. & Rustiami
- Calamus symphysipus Mart. ex Walp.
- Calamus tadulakoensis A.J.Hend., Moh.Iqbal, Rusydi & Pitopang
- Calamus tambingensis A.J.Hend., Pitopang & Moh.Iqbal
- Calamus tapanensis A.J.Hend.
- Calamus temii T.Evans
- Calamus tenompokensis Furtado
- Calamus tenuis Roxb.
- Calamus tetradactyloides Burret
- Calamus tetradactylus Hance
- Calamus thwaitesii Becc.
- Calamus thysanolepis Hance
- Calamus timorensis Becc.
- Calamus trachycoleus Becc.
- Calamus trigynus A.J.Hend., Pitopang & Moh.Iqbal
- Calamus tumidus Furtado
- Calamus unifarius H.Wendl.
- Calamus unijugus (J.Dransf.) W.J.Baker
- Calamus ursinus (Becc.) W.J.Baker
- Calamus usitatus Blanco
- Calamus validus W.J.Baker
- Calamus vattayila Renuka
- Calamus velutinus A.J.Hend. & N.Q.Dung
- Calamus verticillaris Griff.
- Calamus vestitus Becc.
- Calamus vidalianus Becc.
- Calamus viminalis Willd.
- Calamus vinaceus A.J.Hend., Pitopang & Moh.Iqbal
- Calamus vinosus Becc.
- Calamus viridis A.J.Hend., Pitopang & Moh.Iqbal
- Calamus vitiensis Warb. ex Becc.
- Calamus walkeri Hance
- Calamus wanggaii W.J.Baker & J.Dransf.
- Calamus warayanus Adorador & Fernando
- Calamus warburgii K.Schum.
- Calamus wedaensis A.J.Hend.
- Calamus whitmorei J.Dransf.
- Calamus wightii Griff.
- Calamus womersleyi J.Dransf. & W.J.Baker
- Calamus wuliangshanensis San Y.Chen, K.L.Wang & S.J.Pei
- Calamus yentuensis A.J.Hend. & N.Q.Dung
- Calamus zebrinus Becc.
- Calamus zeylanicus Becc.
- Calamus zieckii Fernando
- Calamus zollingeri Becc.
- Calamus zonatus Becc.
