= Dragon's blood (disambiguation) =

Dragon's blood is a bright red resin obtained from a number of distinct plants.

Dragon's blood, dragon blood, or dragon-blood may also refer to:

- Dragon's blood tree, a common name for several plants
  - Calamus draco, a palm formerly in the genus Daemonorops
  - Croton draco, a spurge in the genus Croton
  - Dracaena draco, a tree native to the Canary Islands
  - Dracaena cinnabari, also called the Socotra dragon tree
  - Harungana madagascariensis, a flowering plant found in Madagascar
  - Pterocarpus officinalis, a tree in genus Pterocarpus
- Dota: Dragon's Blood, a 2021 animated television series
- Dragonsblood, a novel by Todd McCaffrey
- The Dragon's Blood, 1957 Italian film also known as "Sigfrido"
- In mythology, the blood of a (slain) dragon

== See also ==
- Far Cry 3: Blood Dragon (2013 video game)
- Blood of the Dragon (disambiguation)
