= Dragon's blood tree =

Dragon's blood tree is a common name for several plants and may refer to:

- Calamus draco, native to southeast Asia
- Dracaena cinnabari, native to Socotra
- Dracaena draco, native to the Canary Islands, Cape Verde, Madeira and Morocco
- Harungana madagascariensis, native from South Africa to Sudan

== See also ==
- Dragon's blood (disambiguation)
