= Polyphenon =

Polyphenon is a series of high grade green tea polyphenol extracts manufactured by the Mitsui Norin Co., Ltd. of Japan. The extracts are in part the result of a water based extraction method which begins with green tea leaves, and then involves successive steps which concentrate the catechins thought to be responsible for the health benefits of green tea.

As of October 2016, 20 clinical trials have been published for Polyphenon E (16 oral and 4 topical). In 2006 the U.S. Food and Drug Administration approved as a drug an ointment containing 15% Polyphenon E for the treatment of genital and perianal warts. The product name is Veregen. To date, no oral use of the product has been approved. Many dietary supplement companies sell green tea extracts as supplements, but as such, are not allowed to make any disease treatment or prevention claims.

== Clinical trials ==
- 1. Joe AK, Schnoll-Sussman F, et al. Phase Ib randomized, double-blinded, placebo-controlled, dose escalation study of Polyphenon E in patients with Barrett's Esophagus. Cancer Prev Res (Phila). 2015;8:1131-7.
- 2. Lovera J, Ramos A, et al. Polyphenon E, non-futile at neuroprotection in multiple sclerosis but unpredictably hepatotoxic: Phase I single group and phase II randomized placebo-controlled studies. J Neurol Sci. 2015;358(1-2):46-52.
- 3. Kumar NB, Pow-Sang J, et al. Randomized, placebo-controlled trial of green tea catechins for prostate cancer prevention. Cancer Prev Res (Phila). 2015;8(10):879-87.
- 4. Crew KD, Ho KA, et al. Effects of a green tea extract, Polyphenon E, on systemic biomarkers of growth factor signaling in women with hormone receptor-negative breast cancer. J Hum Nutr Diet. 2015;28(3):272-82.
- 5. Garcia FA, Cornelison T, et al. Results of a phase II randomized, double-blind, placebo-controlled trial of Polyphenon E in women with persistent high-risk HPV infection and low-grade cervical intraepithelial neoplasia. Gynecol Oncol. 2014;132(2):377-82.
- 6. Dryden GW, Lam A, Beatty K, Qazzaz HH, McClain CJ. A pilot study to evaluate the safety and efficacy of an oral dose of (-)-epigallocatechin-3-gallate-rich polyphenon E in patients with mild to moderate ulcerative colitis. Inflamm Bowel Dis. 2013;19(9):1904-12.
- 7. Crew KD, Brown P, et al. Phase IB randomized, double-blinded, placebo-controlled, dose escalation study of polyphenon E in women with hormone receptor-negative breast cancer. Cancer Prev Res (Phila). 2012;5(9):1144-54.
- 8. Shanafelt TD, Call TG, et al. Phase 2 trial of daily, oral Polyphenon E in patients with asymptomatic, Rai stage 0 to II chronic lymphocytic leukemia. Cancer. 2013;119(2):363-70.
- 9. Wu AH, Spicer D, Stanczyk FZ, Tseng CC, Yang CS, Pike MC. Effect of 2-month controlled green tea intervention on lipoprotein cholesterol, glucose, and hormone levels in healthy postmenopausal women. Cancer Prev Res (Phila). 2012;5(3):393-402.
- 10. Nguyen MM, Ahmann FR, et al. Randomized, double-blind, placebo-controlled trial of polyphenon E in prostate cancer patients before prostatectomy: evaluation of potential chemopreventive activities. Cancer Prev Res (Phila). 2012;5(2):290-8.
- 11. McLarty J, Bigelow RL, et al. Tea polyphenols decrease serum levels of prostate-specific antigen, hepatocyte growth factor, and vascular endothelial growth factor in prostate cancer patients and inhibit production of hepatocyte growth factor and vascular endothelial growth factor in vitro. Cancer Prev Res (Phila). 2009;2(7):673-82.
- 12. Shanafelt TD, Call TG, et al. Phase I trial of daily oral Polyphenon E in patients with asymptomatic Rai stage 0 to II chronic lymphocytic leukemia. J Clin Oncol. 2009;27:3808-14.
- 13. Auger C, Mullen W, Hara Y, Crozier A. Bioavailability of polyphenon E flavan-3-ols in humans with an ileostomy. J Nutr. 2008;138(8):1535S-1542S.
- 14. Chow HH, Hakim IA, et al. Effects of dosing condition on the oral bioavailability of green tea catechins after single-dose administration of Polyphenon E in healthy individuals. Clin Cancer Res. 2005;11(12):4627-33.
- 15. Chow HH, Cai Y, et al. Pharmacokinetics and safety of green tea polyphenols after multiple-dose administration of epigallocatechin gallate and polyphenon E in healthy individuals. Clin Cancer Res. 2003;9(9):3312-9.
- 16. Chow HH, Cai Y, et al. Phase I pharmacokinetic study of tea polyphenols following single-dose administration of epigallocatechin gallate and polyphenon E. Cancer Epidemiol Biomarkers Prev. 2001;10(1):53-8.
- 17. Tatti S, Stockfleth E, et al. Polyphenon E: a new treatment for external anogenital warts. Br J Dermatol. 2010;162(1):176-84.
- 18. Stockfleth E, Beti H, Orasan R, Grigorian F, Mescheder A, Tawfik H, Thielert C. Topical Polyphenon E in the treatment of external genital and perianal warts: a randomized controlled trial. Br J Dermatol. 2008 Jun;158(6):1329-38.
- 19. Gross G, Meyer KG, Pres H, Thielert C, Tawfik H, Mescheder A. A randomized, double-blind, four-arm parallel-group, placebo-controlled Phase II/III study to investigate the clinical efficacy of two galenic formulations of Polyphenon E in the treatment of external genital warts. J Eur Acad Dermatol Venereol. 2007 Nov;21(10):1404-12.
- 20. Ahn WS, Yoo J, Huh SW, Kim CK, Lee JM, Namkoong SE, Bae SM, Lee IP. Protective effects of green tea extracts (polyphenon E and EGCG) on human cervical lesions. Eur J Cancer Prev. 2003 Oct;12(5):383-90.
