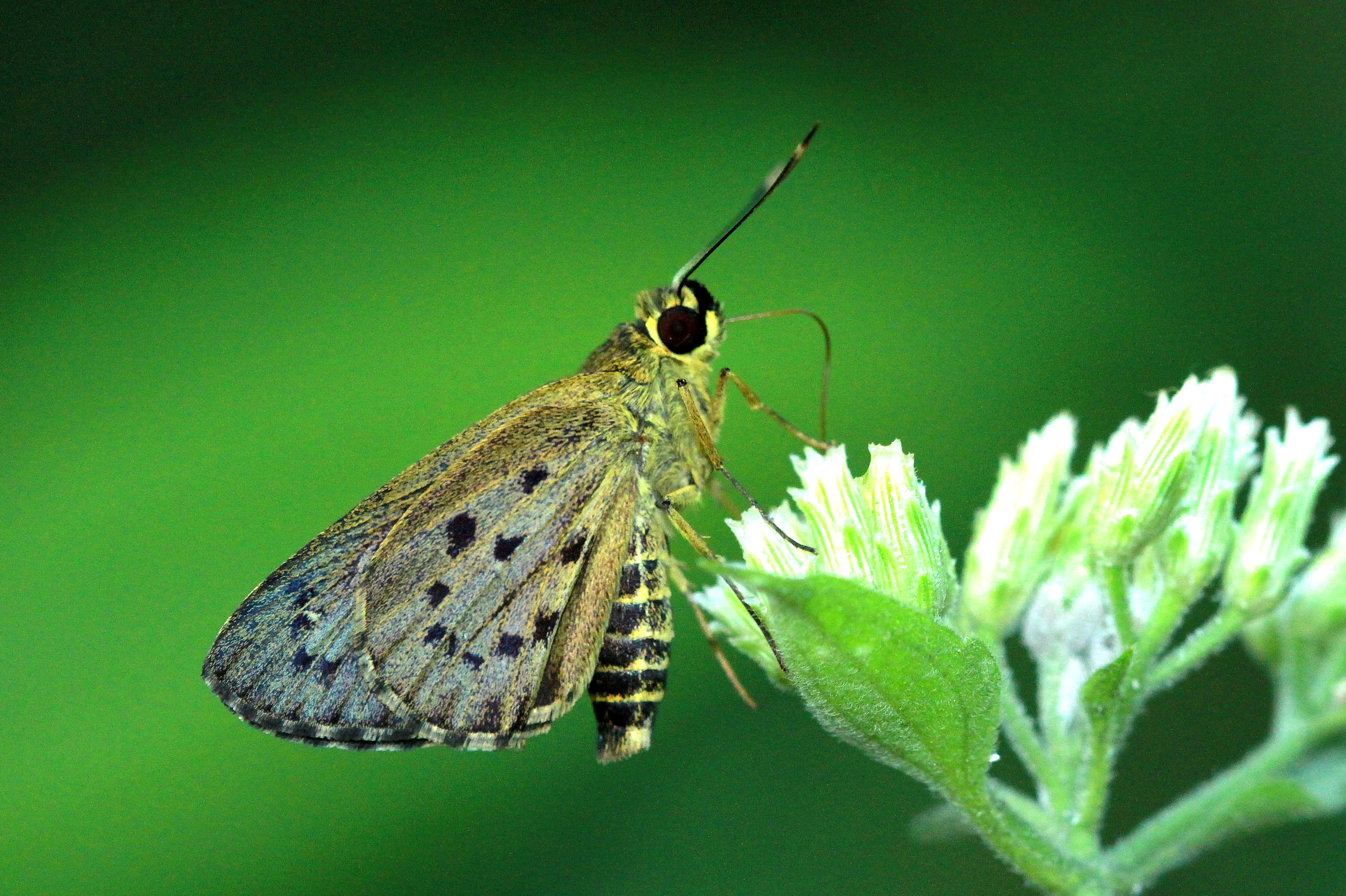

Scientific classification
- Kingdom: Animalia
- Phylum: Arthropoda
- Class: Insecta
- Order: Lepidoptera
- Family: Hesperiidae
- Genus: Salanoemia
- Species: S. sala

Binomial name
- Salanoemia sala (Hewitson, 1866)

Synonyms
- Plastingia sala

= Salanoemia sala =

Maculate lancer

Species of butterfly

Salanoemia sala, the maculate lancer, is a butterfly belonging to the family Hesperiidae found in India, Thailand, Laos and Vietnam.

== Description ==
Upperside dark brown. Anterior wing with four transparent spots; two in the cell minute. Underside grey. Anterior wing dark brown near the base; with three minute brown spots before the apex. Posterior wing with a spot near the middle forming the centre of a circle of several similar brown spots. Female, wings above vandyke-brown with a very faint vinaceous tinge. Anterior wings with four semi-transparent white lustrous spots all close together in middle of the disk, two in the cell, the posterior of which is double the size of the anterior, which is the smallest of all, another immediately behind and in the same straight line the largest of all, being fully double the size of the posterior of the two cellular ones, and the fourth placed quincuncially between the second and third and rather smaller than the former of these. Posterior wings immaculate. Wings below paler, darkest around the spots in the anterior ones, all also suffused with vinaceous. Anterior ones with the sutural area ashy, and a large patch in the interno-median area whiter and showing through on the upperside as a somewhat diffused whitish speck. Posterior wings clothed with ashy scales and bearing a cellular roundish spot darker than the ground-colour, around which spot are semi-circularly arranged three or four similar ones, as in Suastus gremius. Cilia dusky-ashy.

— Edward Yerbury Watson, Hesperiidae Indicae

== Food plants ==
The larvae feed on Calamus rotang, Calamus thwaitesii, Calamus pseudofeanus and Calamus hookerianus.
