= Bionovo =

Biotechnology company

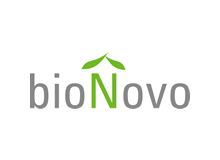
- Company type: Public
- Industry: Biotechnology
- Headquarters: Emeryville, CA, United States
- Key people: Isaac Cohen, Founder and CEO, Mary Tagliaferri, Founder, President and CMO
- Number of employees: 8
- Website: www.bionovo.com

Bionovo (NASDAQ: BNVI.OB) was an American biotechnology company focused on the discovery and development of botanically derived treatments for women's health and cancer based in Emeryville, California. The company had multiple drug candidates in U.S. Food and Drug Administration (FDA) clinical trials- Menerba (formerly known as MF101) a selective estrogen receptor beta agonist for hot flashes associated with menopause Seala (formerly VG101) a selective estrogen receptor beta agonist for menopausal vaginal dryness and Bezielle (formerly BZL101) for advanced breast cancer. The company has ceased activity after filing for Chapter 7 bankruptcy protection in California. Bionovo's stock is no longer listed.

== Discovery and development platform ==
Bionovo used traditional Chinese medicine (TCM) as its discovery engine, isolating, purifying and testing potent active ingredients from herbs and other botanicals, then formulating them into products which can be packaged as powders or pills for easy use by patients.

The company identified the active chemical components underpinning the mechanism of action for all of their lead drug candidates, and in some cases, has developed synthetic methods of production. They are developing their drugs in accordance with the U.S. FDA's botanical drug guidelines.

== Drug pipeline ==
Bionovo's drug pipeline had two drug candidates in clinical trials and several additional candidates positioned to enter clinical trials upon the receipt of funding or partnership.

=== Menerba ===
Bionovo’s lead drug candidate, Menerba (formerly known as MF101), is a novel selective estrogen receptor beta (ERβ) agonist designed to treat vasomotor symptoms (hot flashes) associated with menopause.

Although Menerba is a selective estrogen receptor modulator (SERM), it is distinct from the other FDA-approved SERMs, such as tamoxifen and raloxifene, since these drugs have mixed agonist/antagonist activity and are not selective in transcriptional regulation to one of the two known estrogen receptor subtypes.

Menerba completed its Phase II clinical trial, showing the drug to be safe, clinically efficacious and well tolerated. The drug will begin its Phase III clinical trial pending FDA approval.

=== Bezielle ===
Bezielle (also called BZL101) is an oral drug designed for the treatment of advanced breast cancer. The drug is derived from the herb, Scutellaria Barbata, which is used in traditional Chinese medicine to treat cancer. Bezielle is selectively cytotoxic to most of twelve breast cancer cell lines examined as well as to a number of cancer cell lines of different tissue origins such as prostate, lung, colon, ovarian and pancreatic cancers.

Bezielle’s mechanism of action targets diseased cells while leaving normal cells healthy and intact by inhibiting glycolysis production. Normal cells depend primarily on the citric acid cycle (>85%) and very little on glycolysis (<7%) for energy production. In contrast, cancer cells depend largely on glycolysis (>85%) for energy production. Bezielle induces strong oxidative stress in cancer cells leading to severe DNA damage, but in normal cells the effect is blunted due to their different metabolic profile. Cancer cells attempt but ultimately fail to repair DNA damage that results in the inhibition of glycolysis and cancer cell death while normal cells remain unharmed. Bezielle has completed Phase 1A and 1B clinical trials for advanced metastatic breast cancer.

=== Early stage drug candidates ===
Seala (also known as VG101) for vaginal atrophy was approved by the FDA to begin a Phase I/II clinical trial upon receipt of funding.

BN107 and BN108, both designed to treat advanced breast cancer, are slated to begin Phase I/II clinical trials upon funding.

Bezielle was scheduled to begin a Phase I/II clinical trial for the treatment of pancreatic cancer upon funding.
