= Blood of the Dragon =

Blood of the Dragon may refer to:

- Blood of the Dragon (album), a 2006 musical album by Nox Arcana
- Blood of the Dragon (film), a 1973 martial arts film starring Jimmy Wang Yu
- "Blood of the Dragon" (Mighty Max episode), a 1994 episode of the television series Mighty Max
- Blood of the Dragon (novella), a 1996 novella by George R. R. Martin, later becoming part of his book A Game of Thrones

== See also ==
- Far Cry 3: Blood Dragon (2013 video game)
- Dragon's blood (disambiguation)
