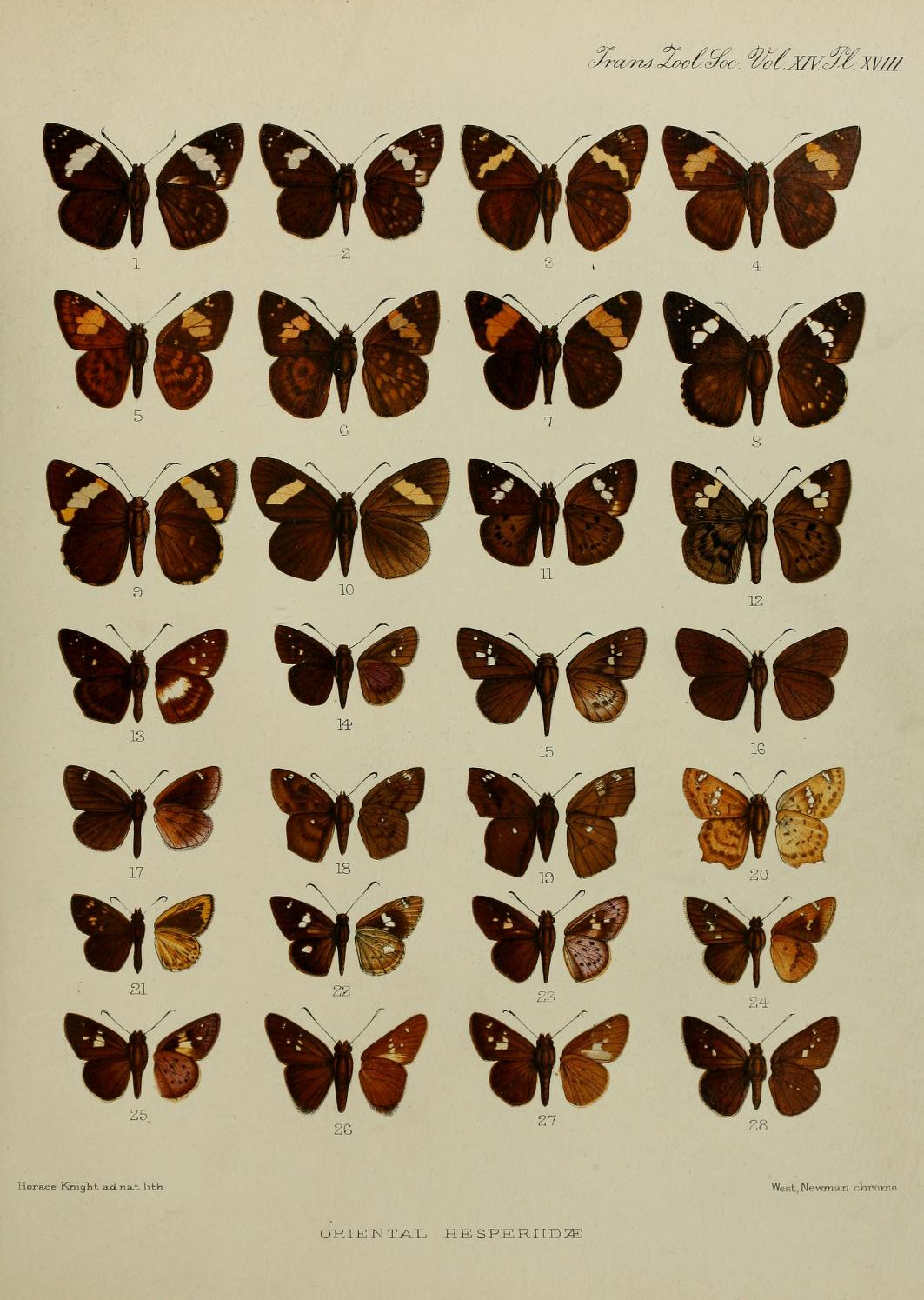
- Salanoemia sala (figures 15, 23)

Scientific classification
- Kingdom: Animalia
- Phylum: Arthropoda
- Class: Insecta
- Order: Lepidoptera
- Family: Hesperiidae
- Tribe: Erionotini
- Genus: Salanoemia; Eliot in Corbet & Pendlebury, 1978

= Salanoemia =

Genus of butterflies

Salanoemia is a genus of grass skipper butterflies in the family Hesperiidae.

== Species ==
- Salanoemia sala (Hewitson, 1866) - maculate lancer
- Salanoemia noemi (de Nicéville, 1885) India (Sikkim, Assam)
- Salanoemia tavoyana (Evans, 1926) Burma, Thailand, North Malaysia, Borneo
- Salanoemia fuscicornis (Elwes & Edwards, 1897) Burma, Thailand, Laos, North Malaysia (Langkawi), Borneo
- Salanoemia shigerui Maruyama, 2000 Sumatra

== Biology ==
The larvae feed on Palmae including Calamus subtenuis

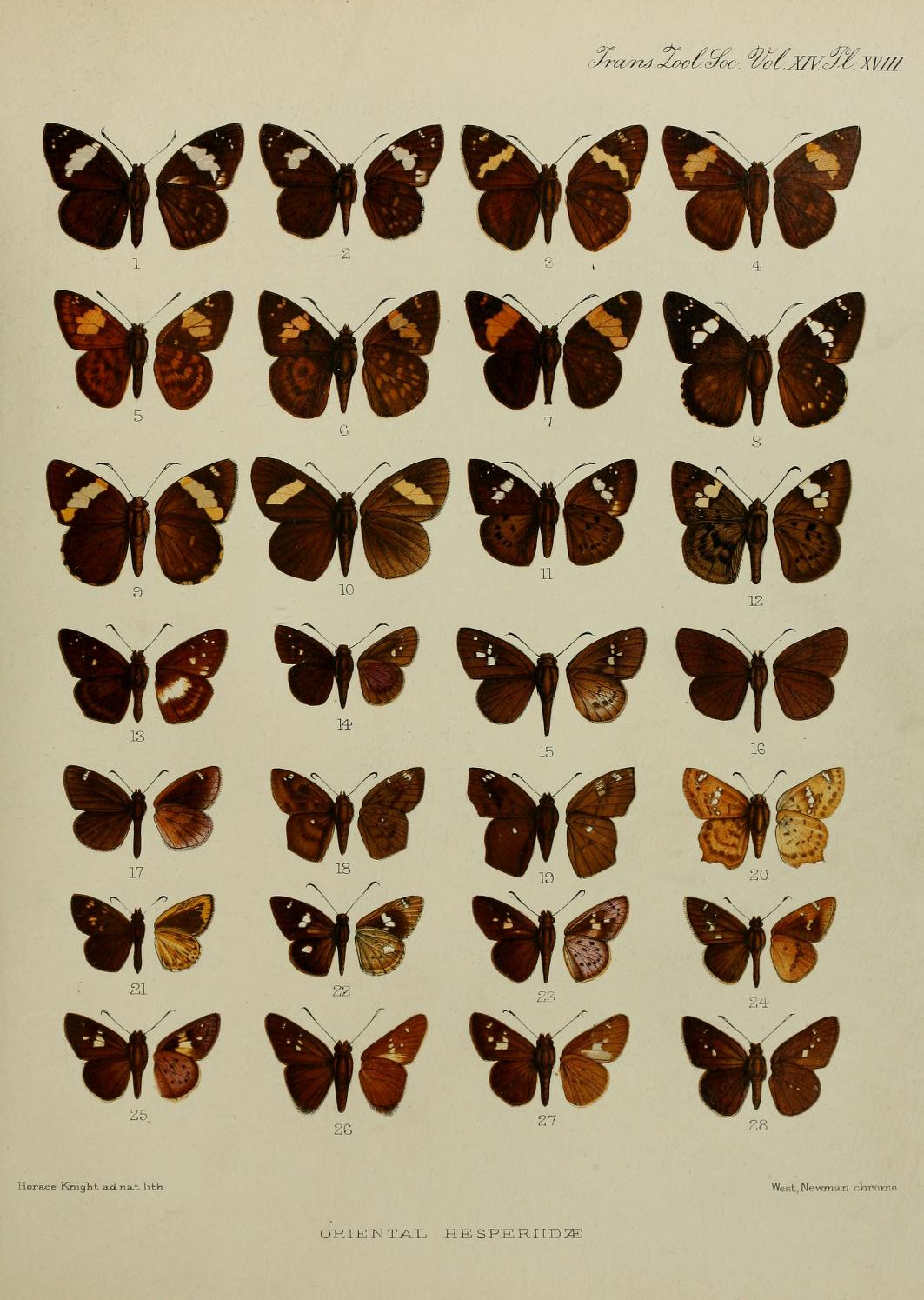
Salanoemia sala and Salanoemia fuscicornis in Elwes & Edwards, 1897 A Revision of the Oriental Hesperiidae

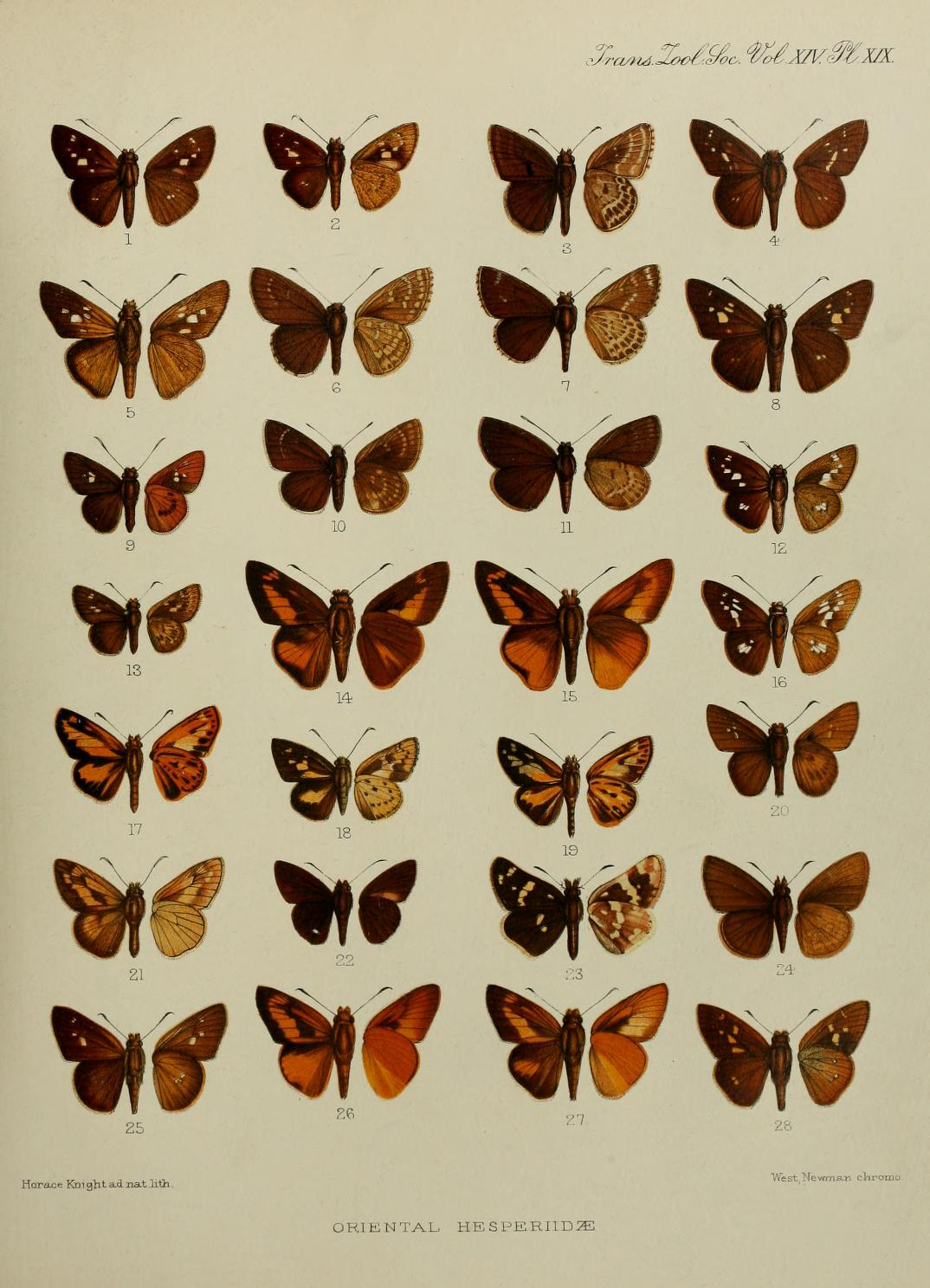
Salanoemia similis in Elwes & Edwards, 1897 A Revision of the Oriental Hesperiidae

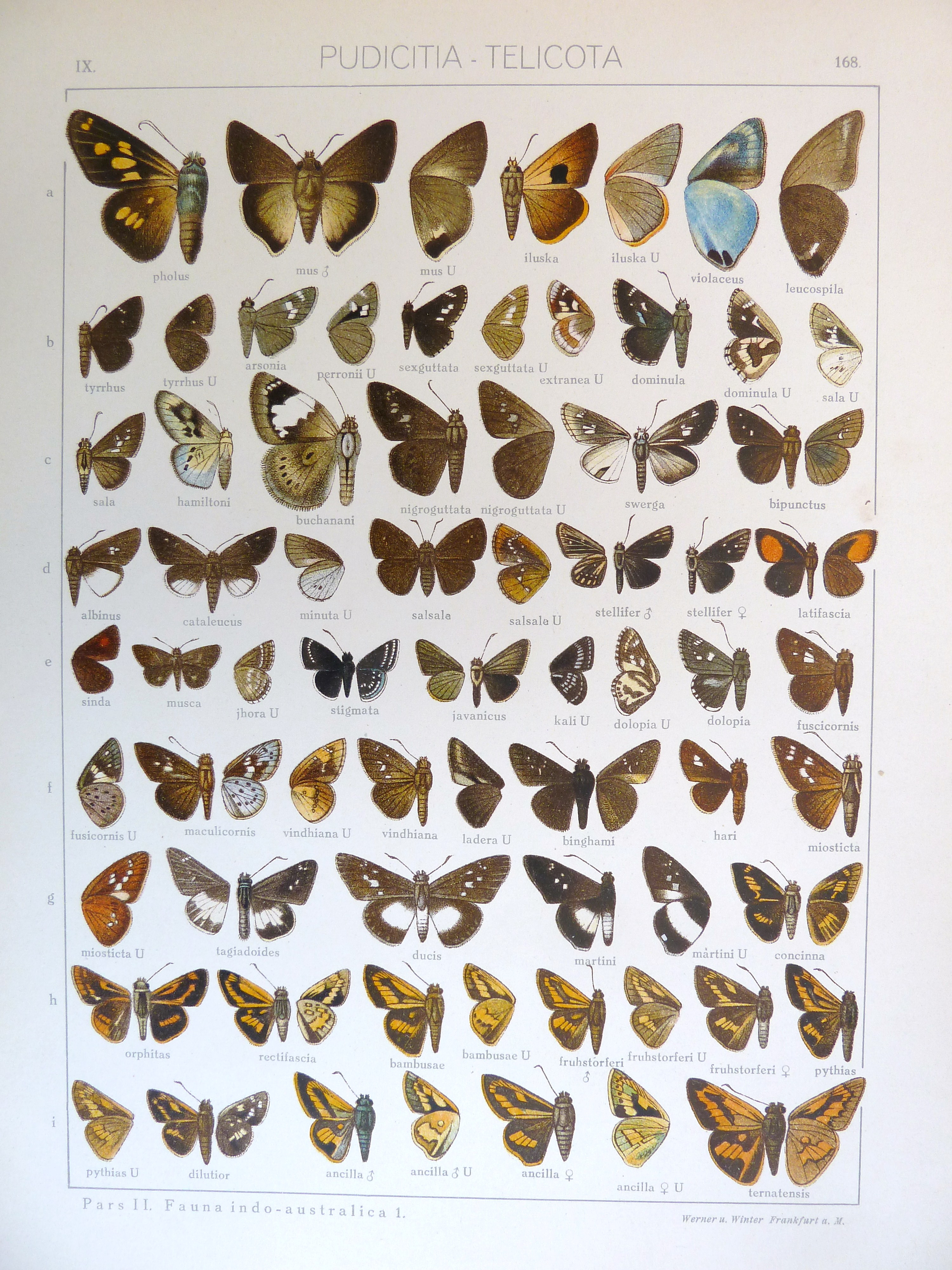
Salanoemia sala in Seitz
