= Dragon's blood =

Bright red plant-based resin

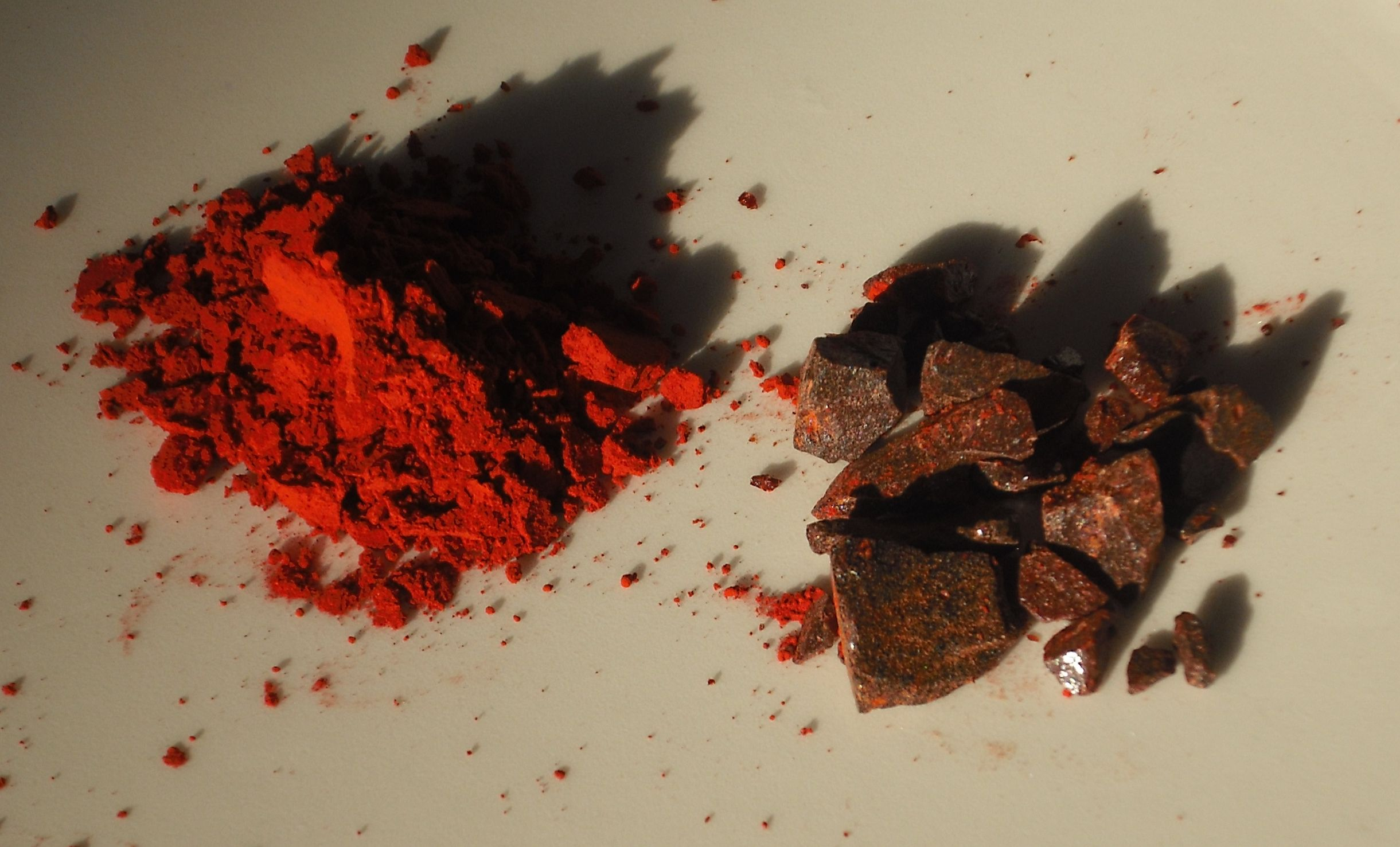
Dragon's blood, powdered pigment or apothecary's grade and roughly crushed incense, extracted from Calamus draco

Dragon's blood is a bright red resin that is obtained from different species of a number of distinct plant genera, including Calamus spp. (previously Daemonorops spp.; including Calamus rotang), Croton, Dracaena and Pterocarpus. The red resin has been in continuous use since ancient times as varnish, medicine, incense, pigment, and dye.

== Name and source ==
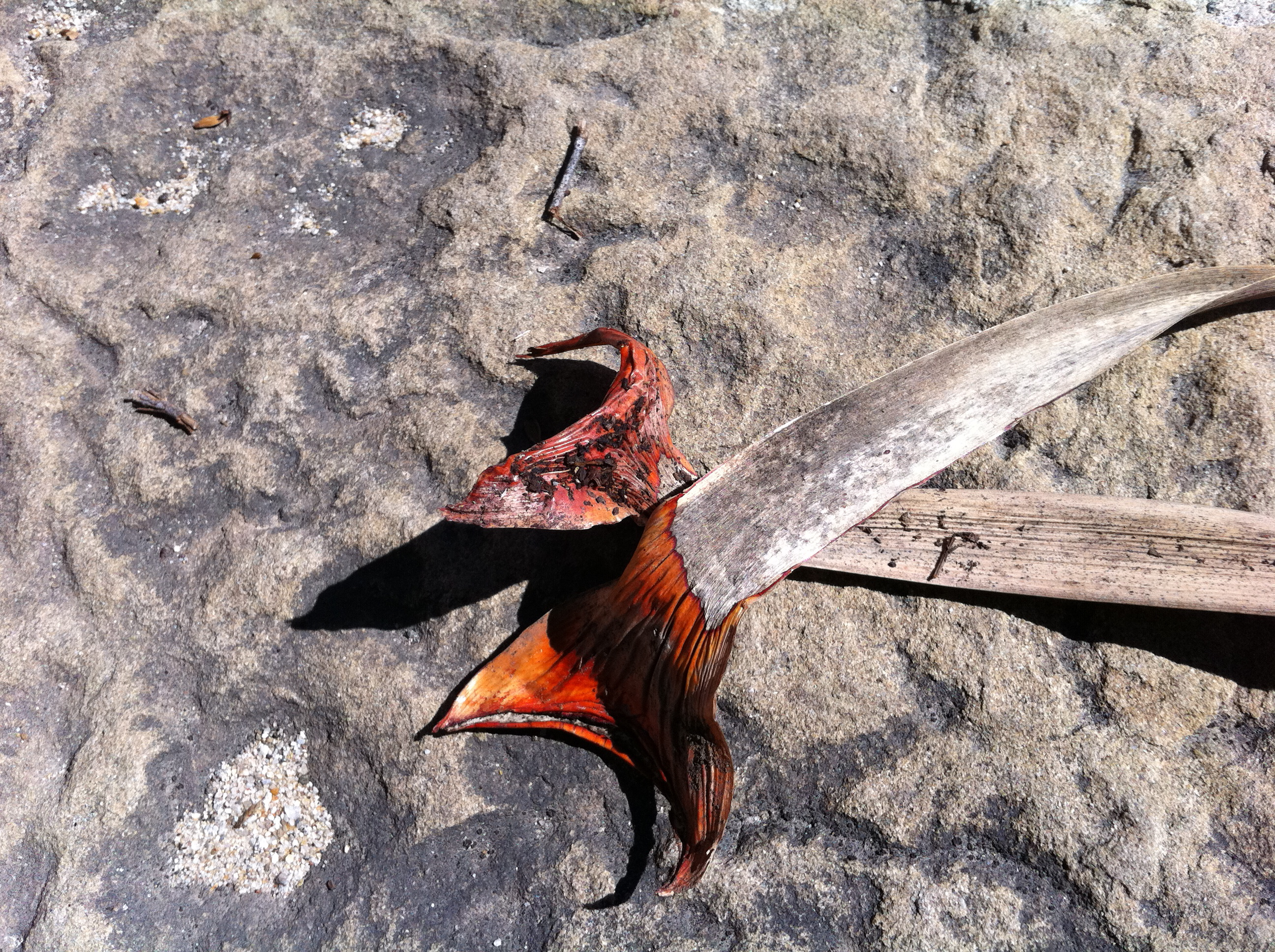
Dracaena draco leaves showing dragon's blood pigment at the base

A great degree of confusion existed for the ancients in regard to the source and identity of dragon's blood. Some medieval encyclopedias claimed its source as the literal blood of dragons and elephants which had perished in mortal combat. The resin of Dracaena species, "true" dragon's blood, and the very poisonous mineral cinnabar (mercury sulfide) were often confused by the ancient Romans. In ancient China, little or no distinction was made among the types of dragon's blood from the different species. Both Dracaena and Calamus resins are still often marketed today as dragon's blood, with little or no distinction being made between the plant sources; however, the resin obtained from Calamus has become the most commonly sold type in modern times, often in the form of large balls of resin. Resins that come from different species and different continents have been given the name "dragon's blood", but their purity, appearance, and chemical properties are highly varied.

The resin of dragon's blood is harvested as deep red teardrop-shaped lumps, separated physically from the fruit of the tree, which on powdering produce a deep crimson powder; unlike most natural resins, which owe their colour to minor acidic components and the depth of colour is sensitive to the pH, the colour of dragon's blood resin is pH-independent and the major constituents themselves are highly coloured.

Several cultures have at least one native resin which can be denominated as dragon's blood, but the natural botanical sources are often different; at least two distinct types of true dragon's blood resin have been recognised, from Dracaena and Daemonorops species. These "true" dragon's blood resins include the East Indian dragon's blood Daemonorops draco and Socotran dragon's blood Dracaena cinnabari.

Resins from the fruit of the southeast Asian rattan- or cane-palm, Daemonorops draco (now Calamus draco), is the primary source for commercially harvested dragon's blood today.

Voyagers to the Canary Islands in the 15th century obtained dragon's blood as dried garnet-red drops from Dracaena draco, a tree native to the Canary Islands and Morocco. The resin is exuded from its wounded trunk or branches. Dragon's blood is also obtained by the same method from the closely related Dracaena cinnabari, which is endemic to the island of Socotra. This resin was traded to ancient Europe via the Incense Road.

Dragon's blood resin is also produced from the rattan palms of the genus Calamus of the Indonesian islands and known there as jernang or djernang. It is gathered by breaking off the layer of red resin encasing the unripe fruit of the rattan. The collected resin is then rolled into solid balls before being sold.

== Visual characteristics ==
In his study of artists' pigments, the chemist George Field described dragon's blood as "a warm semi-transparent, rather dull, red colour, which is deepened by impure air, and darkened by light".

== History and uses ==
The dragon's blood known in antiquity was mostly collected from Dracaena cinnabari, and is mentioned in the 1st century Periplus Maris Erythraei (xxx.10.17) as one of the products of Socotra. Socotra had been an important trading centre since at least the time of the Ptolemies. Dragon's blood was used as a dye, painting pigment, and medicine (respiratory and gastrointestinal problems) in the Mediterranean basin, and was held by early Greeks, Romans, and Arabs to have medicinal properties. Dioscorides and other early Greek writers described its medicinal uses.

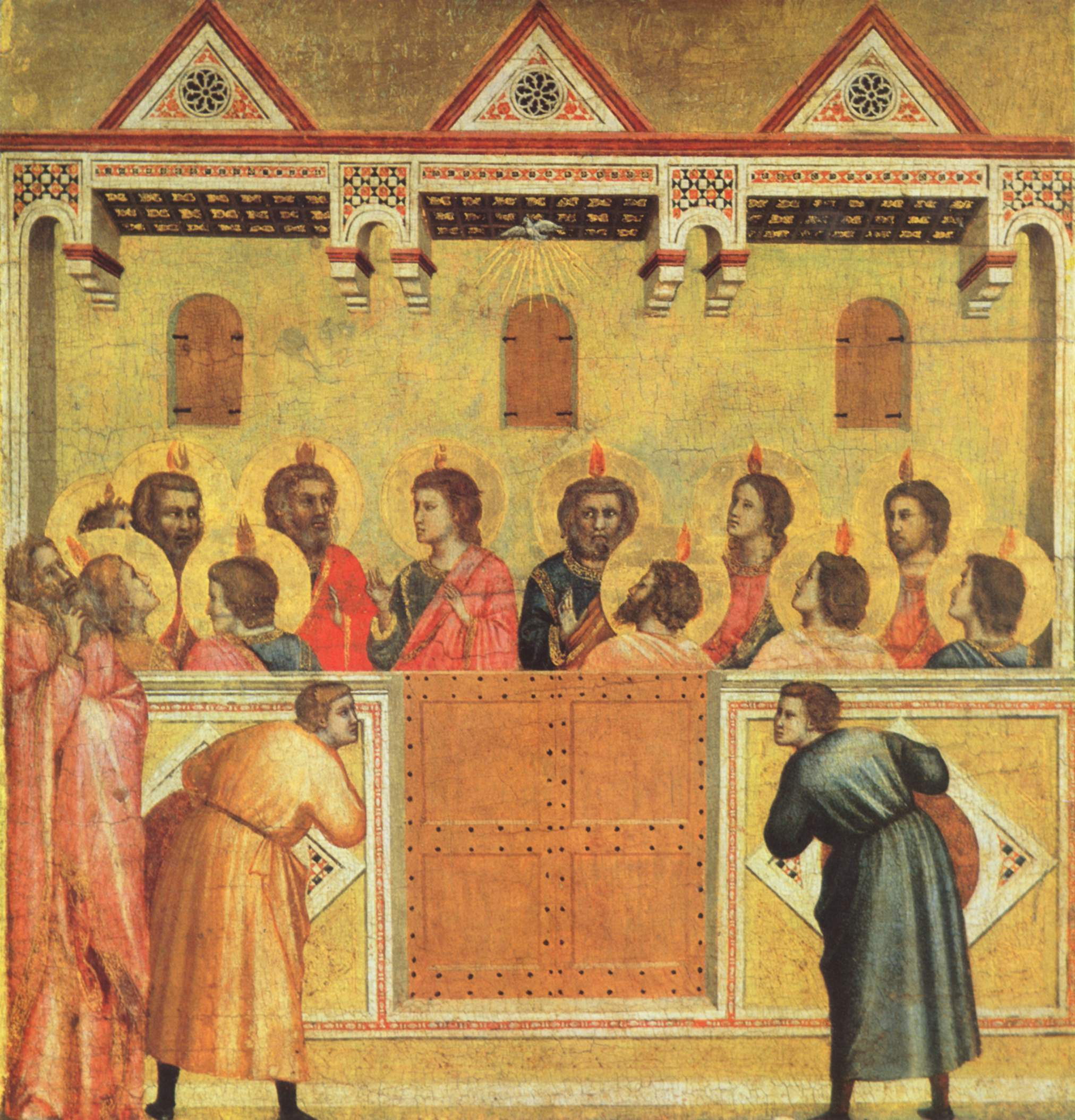
Giotto di Bondone's Pentecost

A notable occurrence of dragon's blood red in art is in Giotto's Pentecost. In this painting, it is believed that the pigment used in the orange-red flames over the Apostles' heads is dragon's blood.

Locals on Socotra island use the Dracaena resin as a sort of cure-all, using it for such things as general wound healing, a coagulant (though this is ill-advised with commercial products, as the Calamus species acts as an anti-coagulant and it is usually unknown what species the dragon's blood came from), curing diarrhea, lowering fevers, dysentery diseases, taken internally for ulcers in the mouth, throat, intestines and stomach, as well as an antiviral for respiratory viruses, stomach viruses and for skin disorders such as eczema. It was also used in medieval ritual magic and alchemy.

Dragon's blood of both Dracaena draco (commonly referred to as the Draconis Palm) and Dracaena cinnabari were used as a source of varnish for 18th century Italian violinmakers. There was also an 18th-century recipe for toothpaste that contained dragon's blood.

Dragon's blood from both Calamus were used for ceremonies in India. Sometimes Dracaena resin, but more often Calamus resin, was used in China as red varnish for wooden furniture. It was also used to colour the surface of writing paper for banners and posters, used especially for weddings and for Chinese New Year.

Dragon's blood incense is also occasionally sold as "red rock opium" to unsuspecting would-be drug buyers. It actually contains no opiates, and has only slight psychoactive effects, if any at all.

Thaspine from the dragon's blood of the species Croton lechleri has possible use as a cancer drug.

Today, dragon's blood from a South American plant can be bought in health food stores.

Painters used dragon's blood in the creation of flesh tones during the 17th century. By the 19th century, publications on artists' materials indicate that it was most useful as a varnish, not as pigment for painting. In 1835, George Field stated that dragon's blood is "unsatisfactory for painting". However, the pigment was used to prepare the colour known as "Chinese orange".

Despite being made in the first century, the colour dragon's blood had a major breakthrough in the year 1880 when the plant "Dracaena cinnabari was discovered by professor Bayley Balfour who was on an expedition to the Socotra island". While on this island Balfour "collected samples of Dracaena cinnabari and sent the samples to be analysed by at the time Glasgow's Professor of Chemistry James Dobbie and G Henderson". This marked a major turning point in rediscovering the origins of dragon's blood as it began the first formal scientific investigation into the colour dragon's blood. This research into Dracaena cinnabari and dragon's blood which was conducted during the 1880s allowed the finding that "Of the 15 Dracaena resin samples in the EBC some had certain geographic origins that were not from Socotra Island, but most are of D. cinnabari samples kept in the EBC are from Socotra Balfour himself". This was important as it allowed researchers to find that the plants used to make the dragon's blood can be found in certain geographic regions. Dragon's blood, despite being used for paint, was also used for various medical applications during the period between 1880 and 1914 as a type of "cure-all, stimulant, muscle-relaxant and abortifacient".

Today, dragon's blood has a variety of uses. In addition to its use as a pigment, it is still used as a varnish for violins, in photoengraving, as a medicine, as an incense resin, as a body oil, as a stimulant, and as an abortifacient. The occurrence of bitter taste masking compounds in dragon's blood from Daemonorops draco indicates the relevance of the species for use in food, beverage, and pharmaceutical industries.

== Safety ==
A study on oral toxicity of the DC resin methanol extract taken from the perennial tree Dracaena cinnabari was performed on female Sprague Dawley rats in February 2018. Acute and sub-acute oral toxicity tests found that the extract could be tolerated up to 2,000 mg/kg body weight.

== List of botanical sources ==
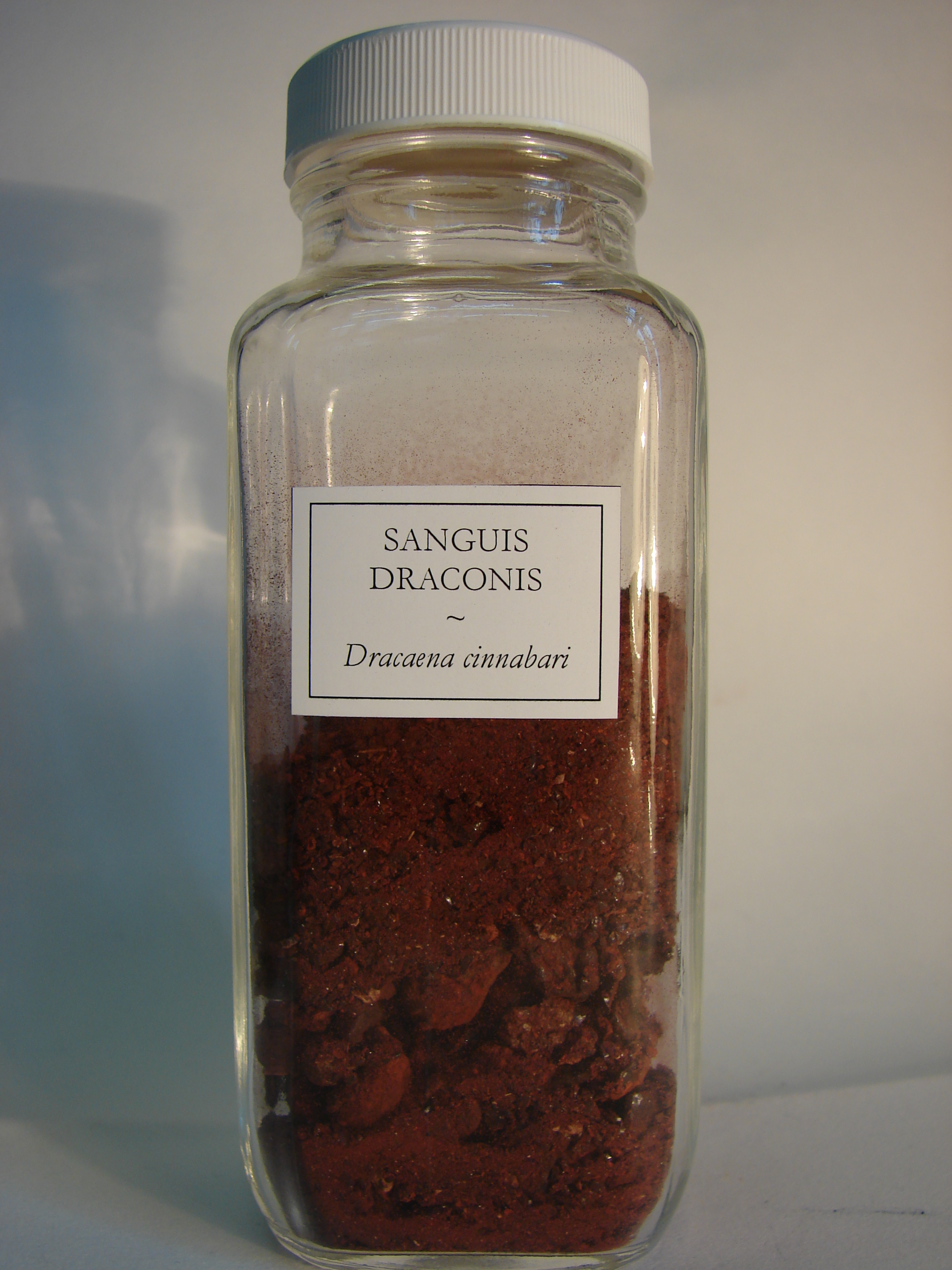
Dragon's blood from Dracaena cinnabari

- Calamus rotang L.
- Calamus draco Willd. (synonyms include Daemonorops draco, D. rubra)
- Calamus didymophyllus Becc. Ridl. (synonyms include Daemonorops motleyi, D. didymophylla)
- Croton draconoides Müll. Arg.
- Croton draco Schltdl. & Cham.
- Croton lechleri Müll. Arg.
- Croton erythrochilus Müll. Arg.
- Croton palanostigma Klotzsch
- Croton perspeciosus Croizat
- Croton rimbachii Croizat
- Croton sampatik Müll. Arg.
- Croton urucurana Baill.
- Croton xalapensis Kunth
- Dracaena cinnabari Balf.f.
- Dracaena cochinchinensis hort. ex Baker
- Dracaena draco (L.) L.
- Pterocarpus officinalis Jacq.

== See also ==
- Crofelemer, South American tree (Croton lechleri), unrelated to Dracaena and rattan palm (the generus Calamus)
