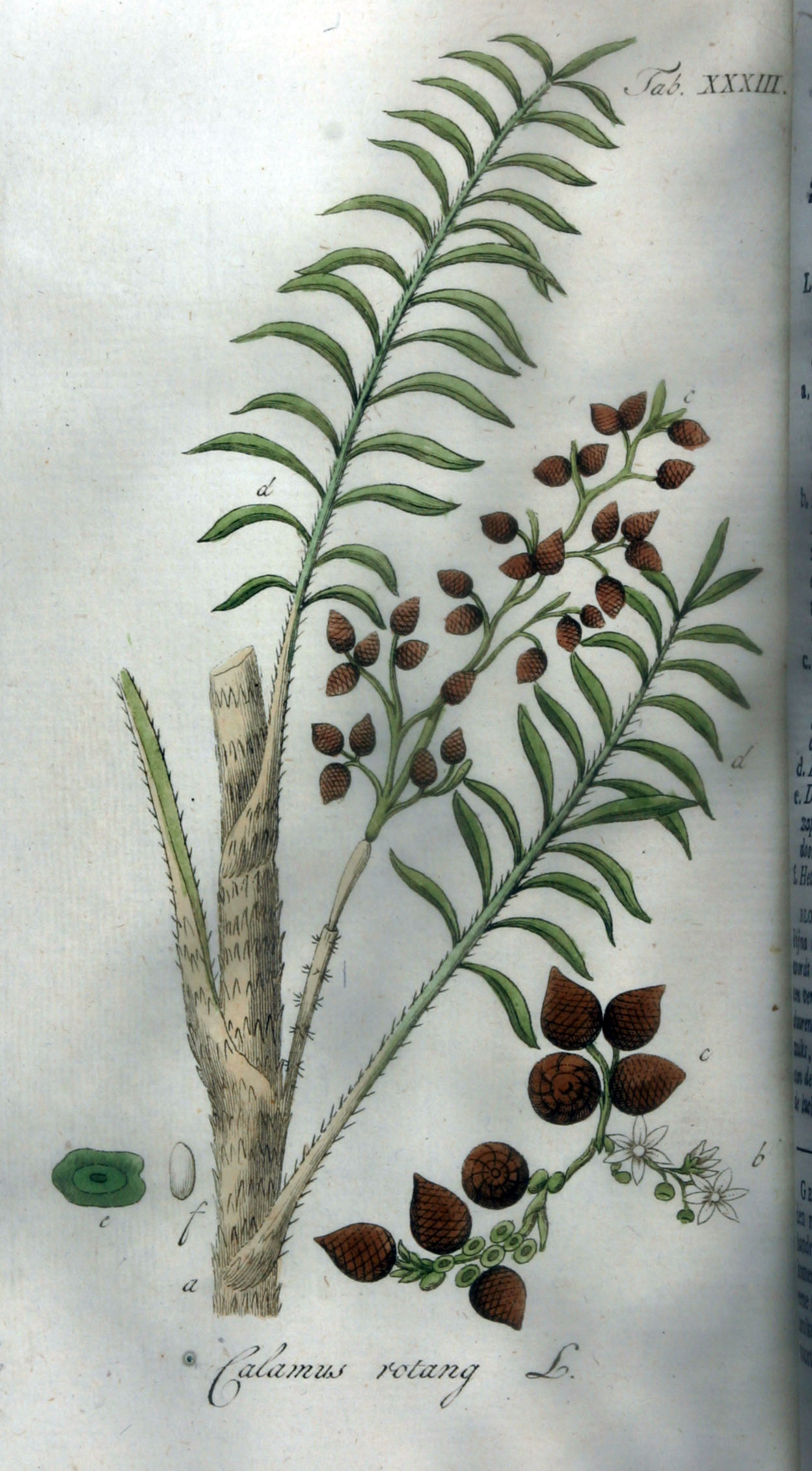

Scientific classification
- Kingdom: Plantae
- Clade: Tracheophytes
- Clade: Angiosperms
- Clade: Monocots
- Clade: Commelinids
- Order: Arecales
- Family: Arecaceae
- Genus: Calamus
- Species: C. rotang

Binomial name
- Calamus rotang L.

Synonyms
- Calamus monoecus Roxb.; Calamus roxburghii Griff.; Calamus scipionum Lam.; Draco rotang Crantz; Palmijuncus monoecus (Roxb.) Kuntze; Rotang linnaei Baill.; Rotanga calamus Crantz

= Calamus rotang =

Species of palm

Calamus rotang, also known as common rattan, is a plant species native to India, Sri Lanka and Myanmar (Burma). It is one of the scandent (climbing) rattan palms used to make Malacca cane furniture, baskets, walking-sticks, umbrellas, tables and general wickerwork, and is found in Southwest Asia. The basal section of the plant grows vertically for 10 metres or so, after which the slender, tough stem of a few centimetres in diameter, grows horizontally for 200 metres or more. It is extremely flexible and uniform in thickness, and frequently has sheaths and petioles armed with backward-facing spines which enable it to scramble over other plants. It has pinnate, alternate leaves, 60–80 cm long, armed with two rows of spines on the upper face.

The plants are dioecious, and flowers are clustered in attractive inflorescences, enclosed by spiny spathes. The edible fruits are top-shaped, covered in shiny, reddish-brown imbricate scales, and exude an astringent red resin known medicinally and commercially as "dragon's blood".

The canes are sought after and expensive, but have to a large extent been replaced by sticks made from plants, such as bamboos, rushes and osier willows.

== Gallery ==
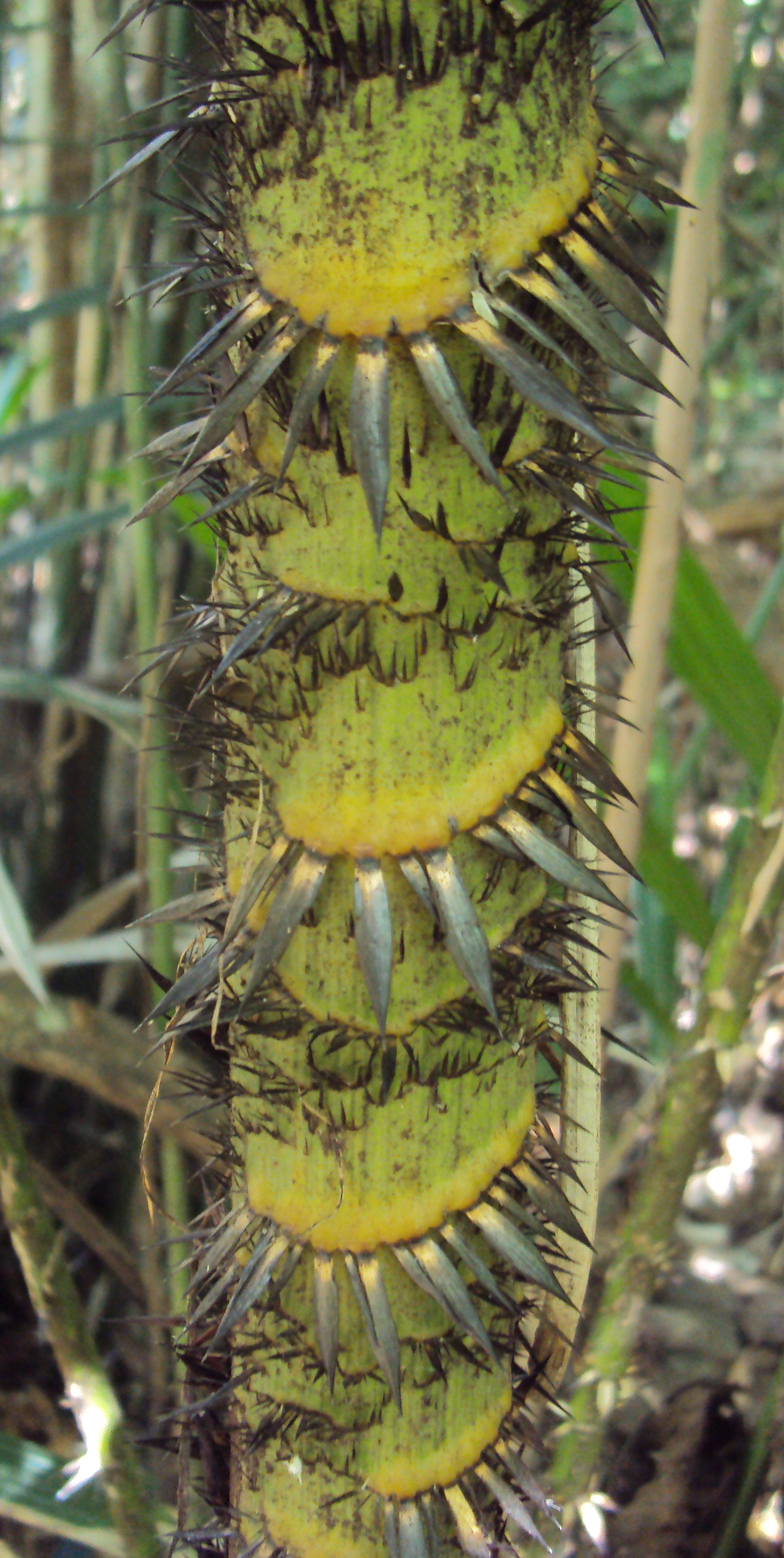
Stem

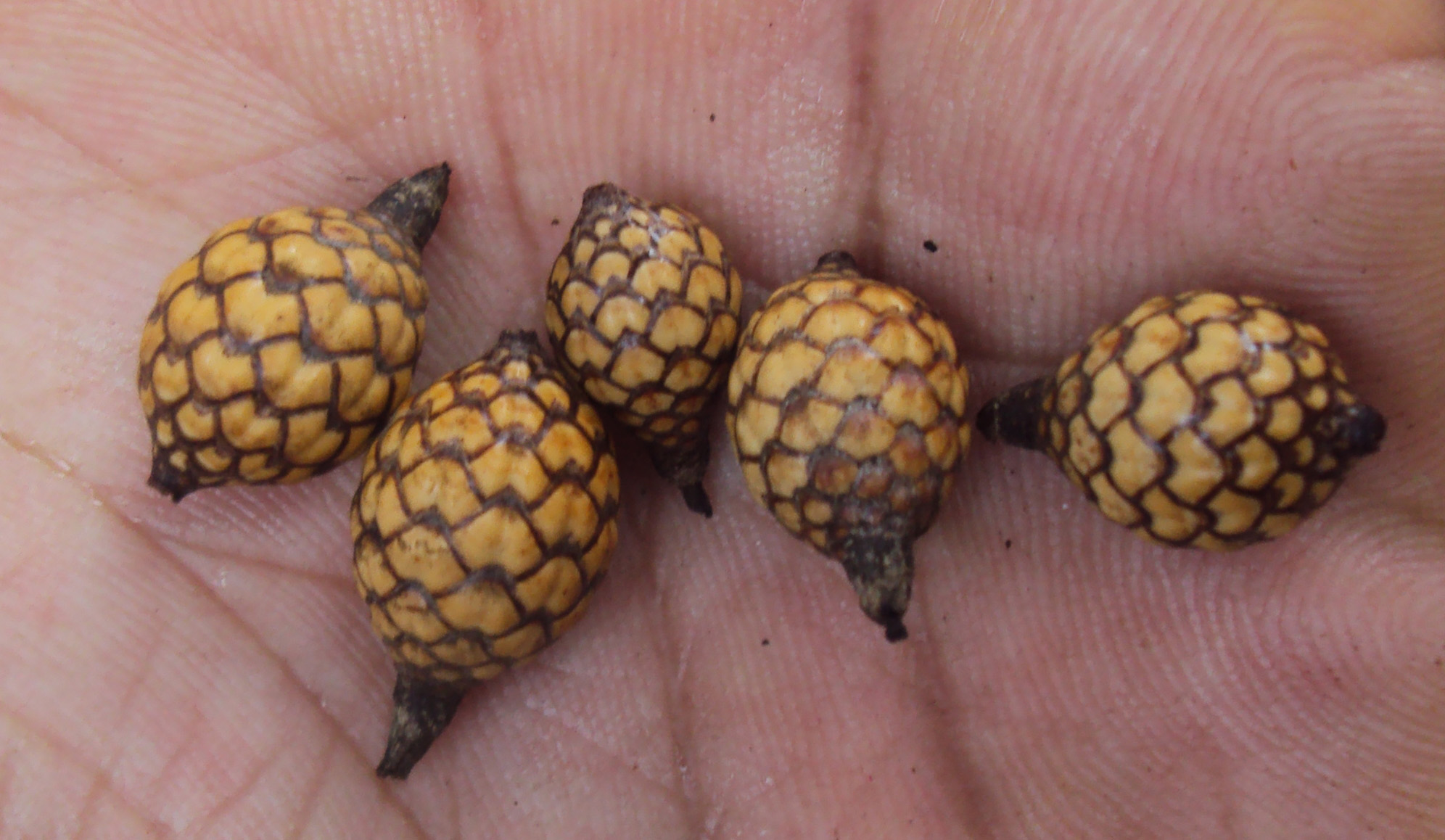
Fruit

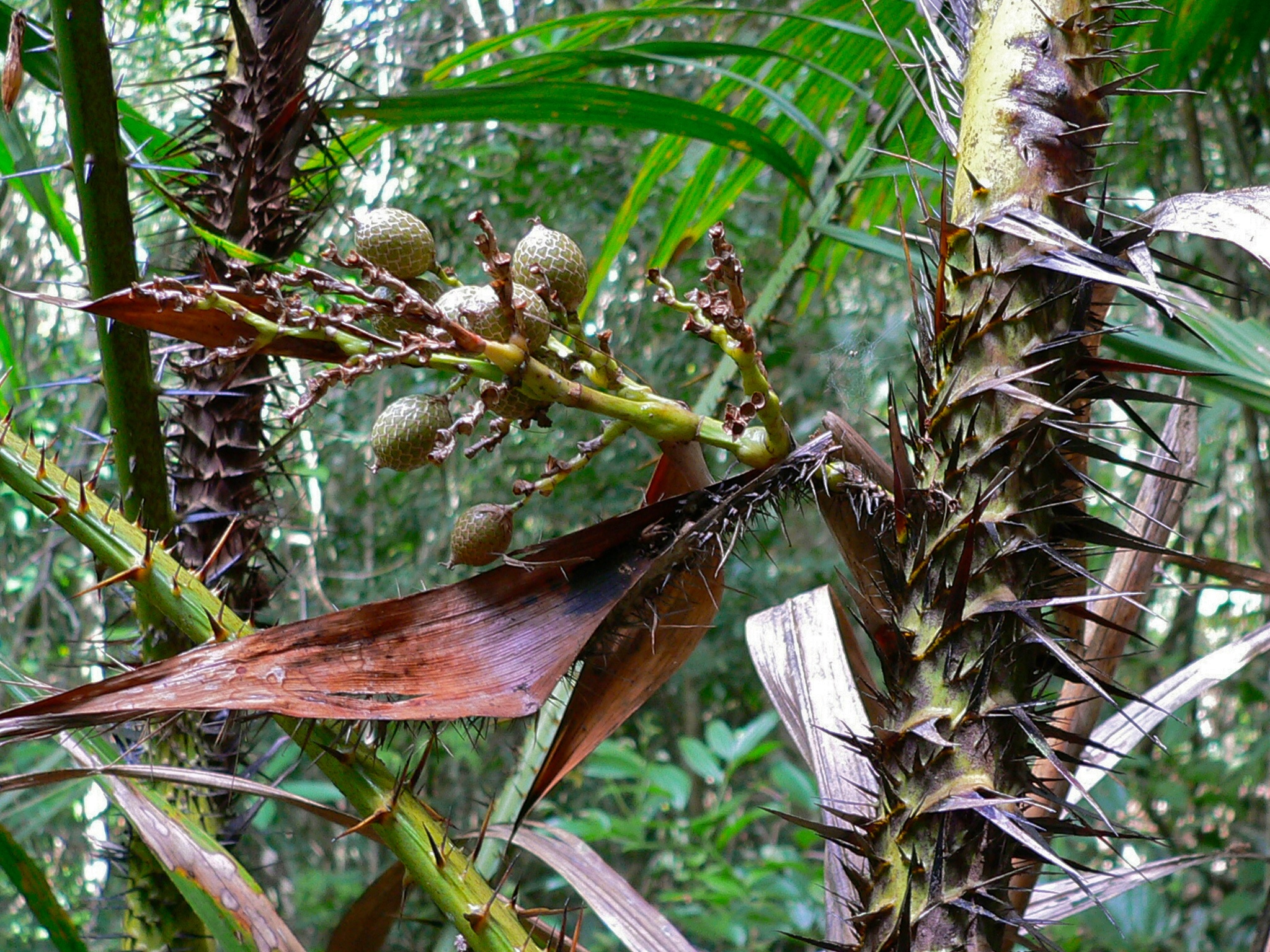
Rotang with fruits

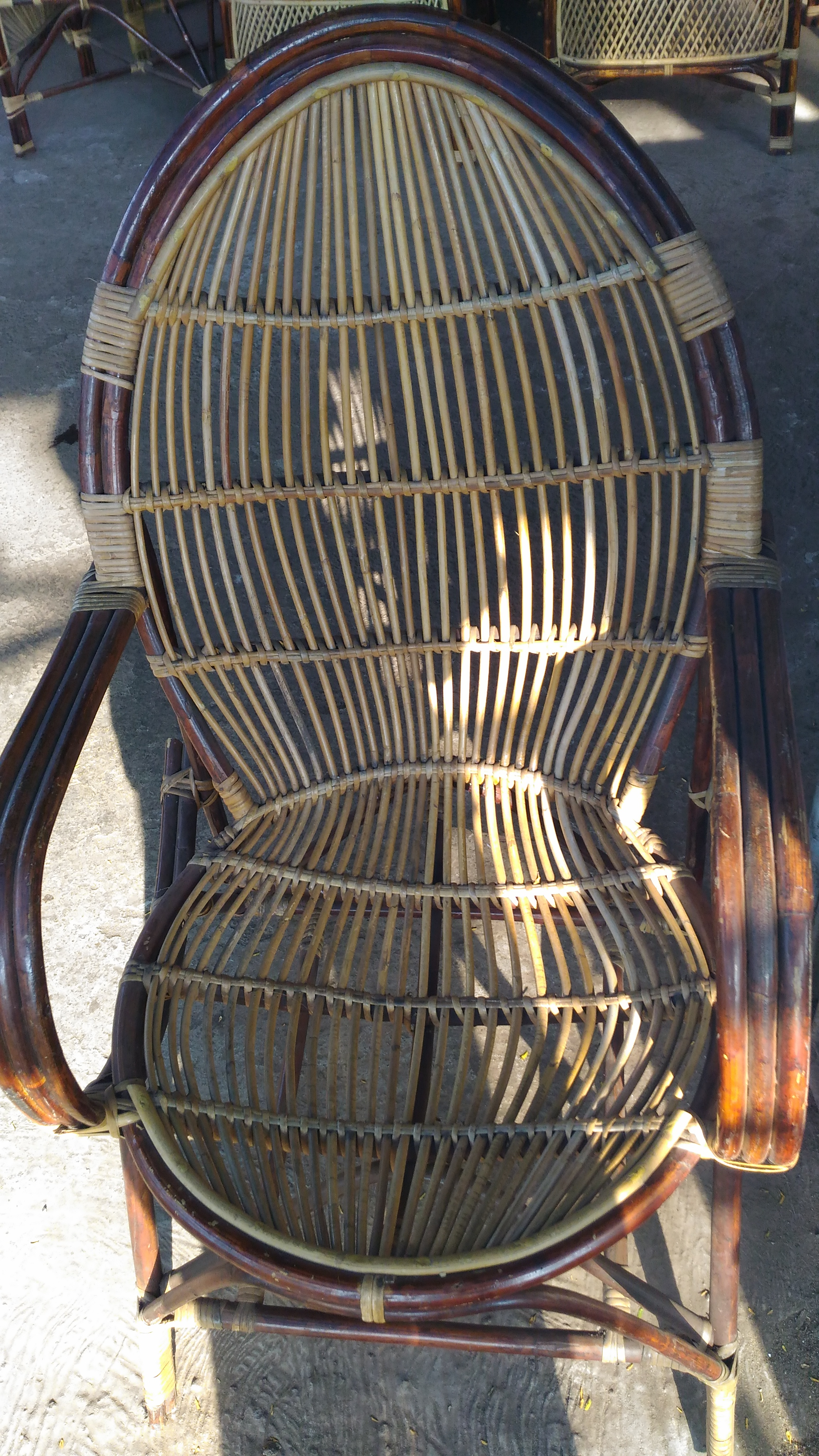
Malacca cane chair

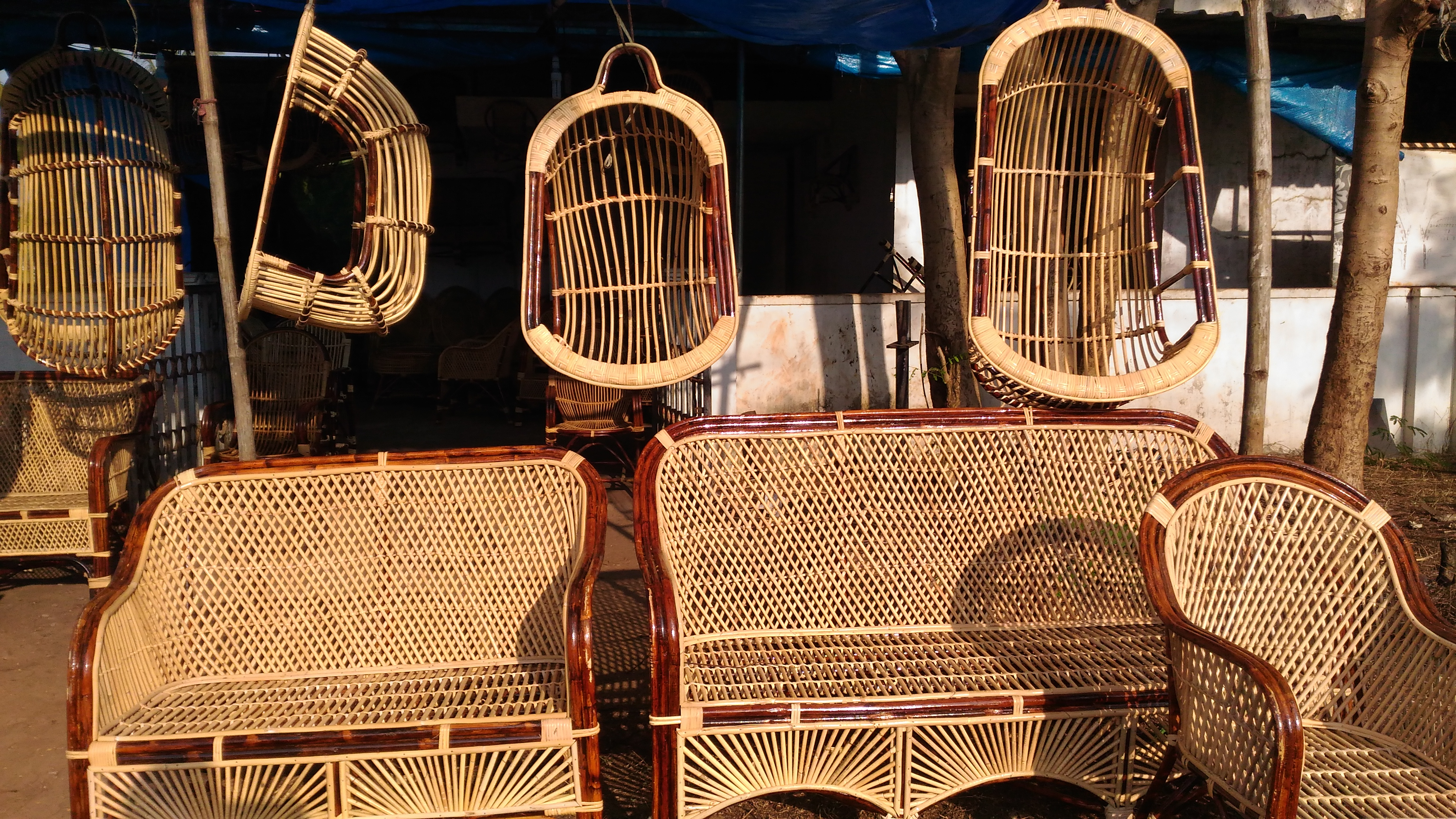
Malacca cane furniture
