= Sinecatechins =

Extract of green tea leaves

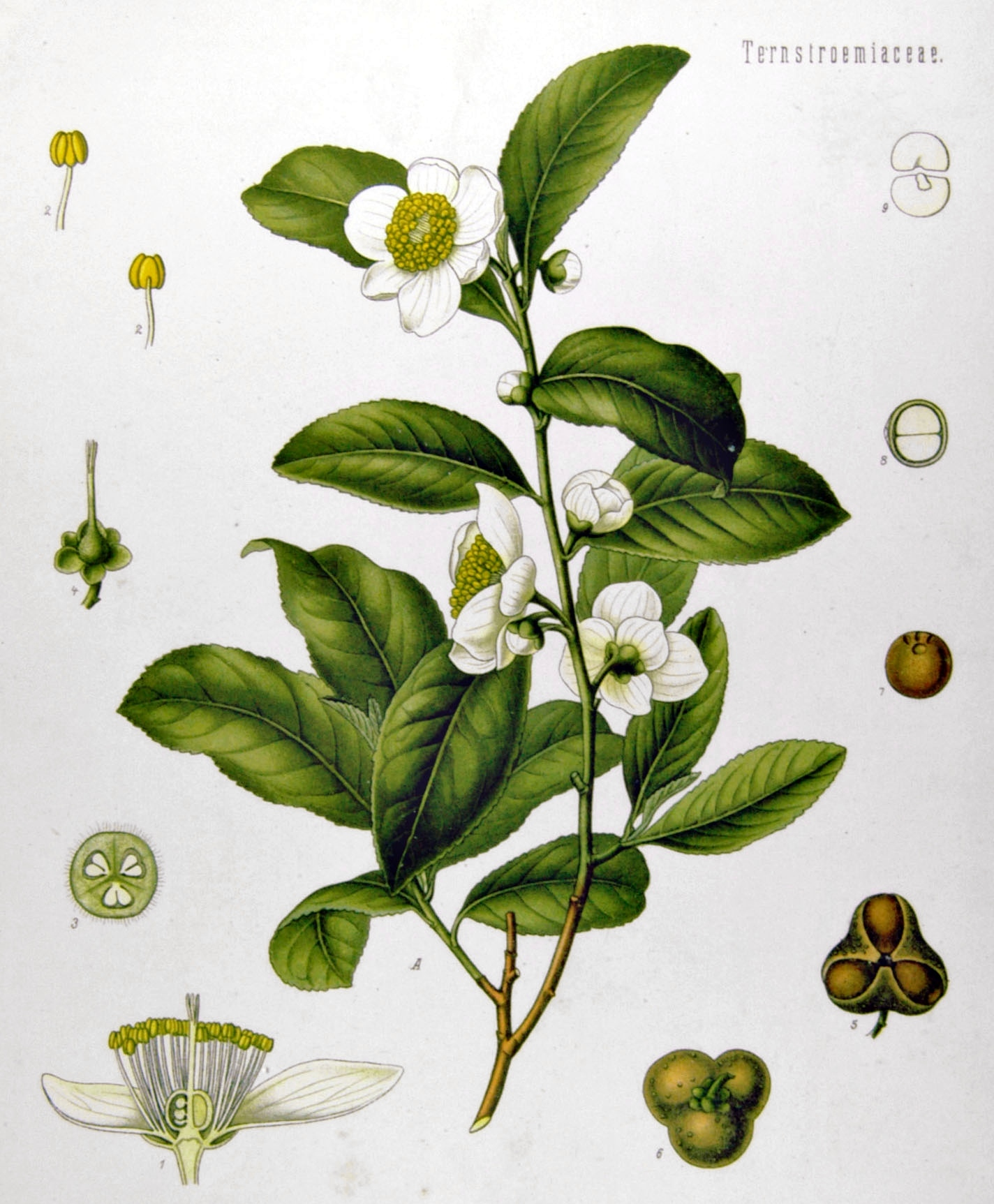
Sinecatechins is an extract from the leaves of Camellia sinensis.

Sinecatechins (USAN, trade names Veregen and Polyphenon E) is a specific water extract of green tea leaves from Camellia sinensis that is the active ingredient in an ointment approved by the FDA in 2006 as a botanical drug to treat genital warts. Sinecatechins are mostly catechins, 55% of which is epigallocatechin gallate. It was the first botanical drug approved by the US FDA.
