= Taspine =

Chemical compound

Names
- IUPAC name 1-[2-(Dimethylamino)ethyl]-3,8-dimethoxy[1]benzopyrano[5,4,3-cde][1]benzopyran-5,10-dione
- Other names Thaspine

Identifiers
CAS Number	602-07-3
3D model (JSmol)	Interactive image
ChemSpider	186530
PubChem CID	215159
UNII	V53XN9L07O
CompTox Dashboard (EPA)	DTXSID60975624
- InChI: InChI=1S/C20H19NO6/c1-21(2)8-7-10-9-13(25-4)18-16-14(10)20(23)27-17-12(24-3)6-5-11(15(16)17)19(22)26-18/h5-6,9H,7-8H2,1-4H3 Key: MTAWKURMWOXCEO-UHFFFAOYSA-N
- SMILES: CN(C)CCC1=CC(=C2C3=C1C(=O)OC4=C(C=CC(=C34)C(=O)O2)OC)OC

Properties
Chemical formula	C_{20}H_{19}NO_{6}
Molar mass	369.4 g/mol
- Except where otherwise noted, data are given for materials in their standard state (at 25 °C [77 °F], 100 kPa). Infobox references

Taspine is an alkaloid which acts as a potent acetylcholinesterase inhibitor and cicatrizant. It is found in various plants including Magnolia x soulangeana and Croton lechleri.

The first total synthesis was reported by T. Ross Kelly and Roger L. Xie in 1998.
