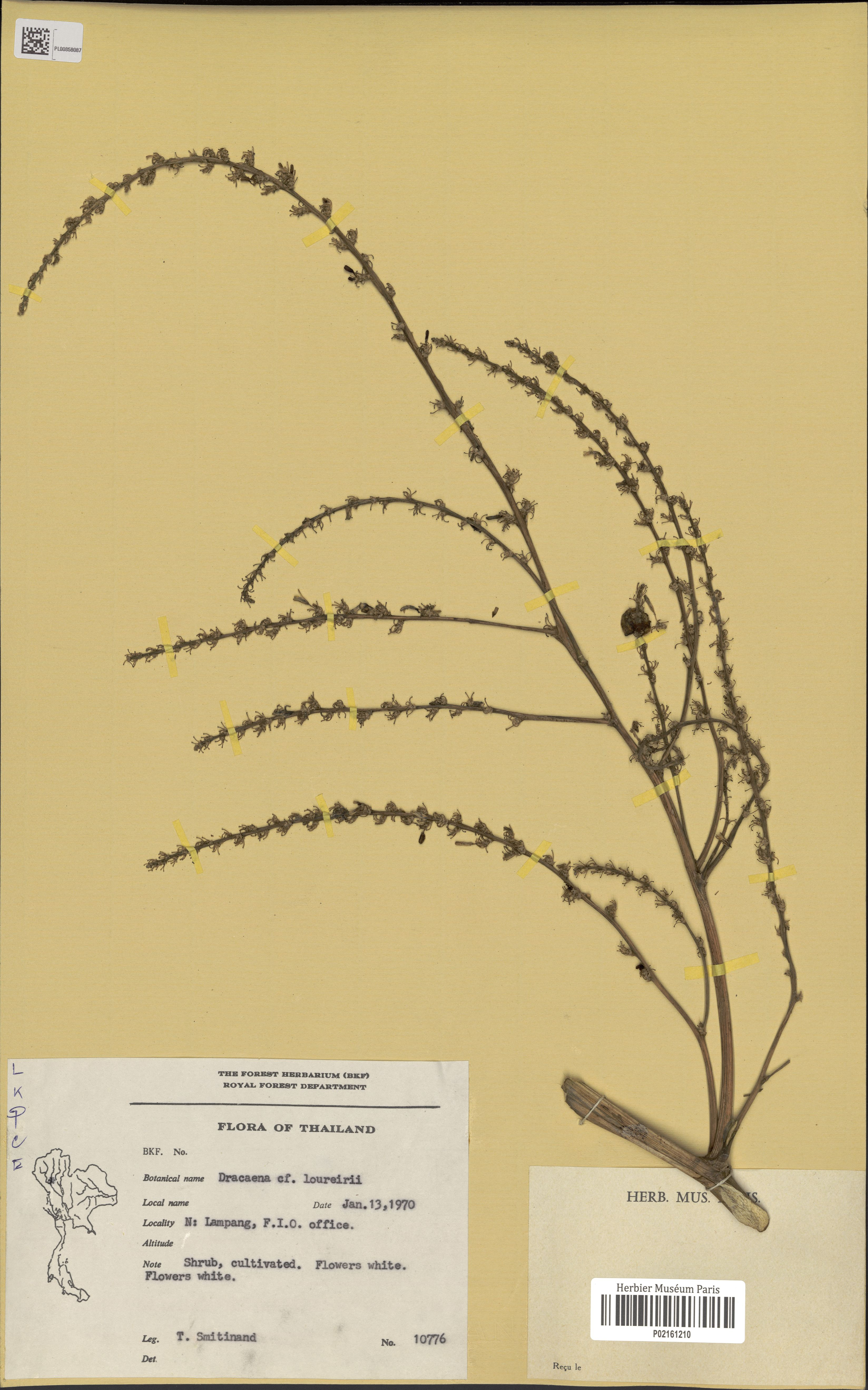

Conservation status
- Least Concern (IUCN 3.1)

Scientific classification
- Kingdom: Plantae
- Clade: Tracheophytes
- Clade: Angiosperms
- Clade: Monocots
- Order: Asparagales
- Family: Asparagaceae
- Subfamily: Convallarioideae
- Genus: Dracaena
- Species: D. cochinchinensis

Binomial name
- Dracaena cochinchinensis (Lour.) S.C.Chen

Synonyms
- List: Draco saposchnikowii (Regel) Kuntze Dracaena saposchnikowii Regel Dracaena loureiroi Gagnep. Aletris cochinchinensis Lour.

= Dracaena cochinchinensis =

Species of flowering plant

Dracaena cochinchinensis is a species of Asian tropical forest under-storey plants in the family Asparagaceae; no subspecies are listed in the Catalogue of Life.

== Distribution and description ==
The recorded distribution is from southern China to Indo-China. In Vietnam the plant may be called huyết giác, or giáng ông.

D. cochinchinensis is a shrub, up to 3 m high, with red tubers and leaves 200-800 x 20-30 mm wide. The flowers are green and later the black berries are about 10 mm in diameter.

== Gallery ==
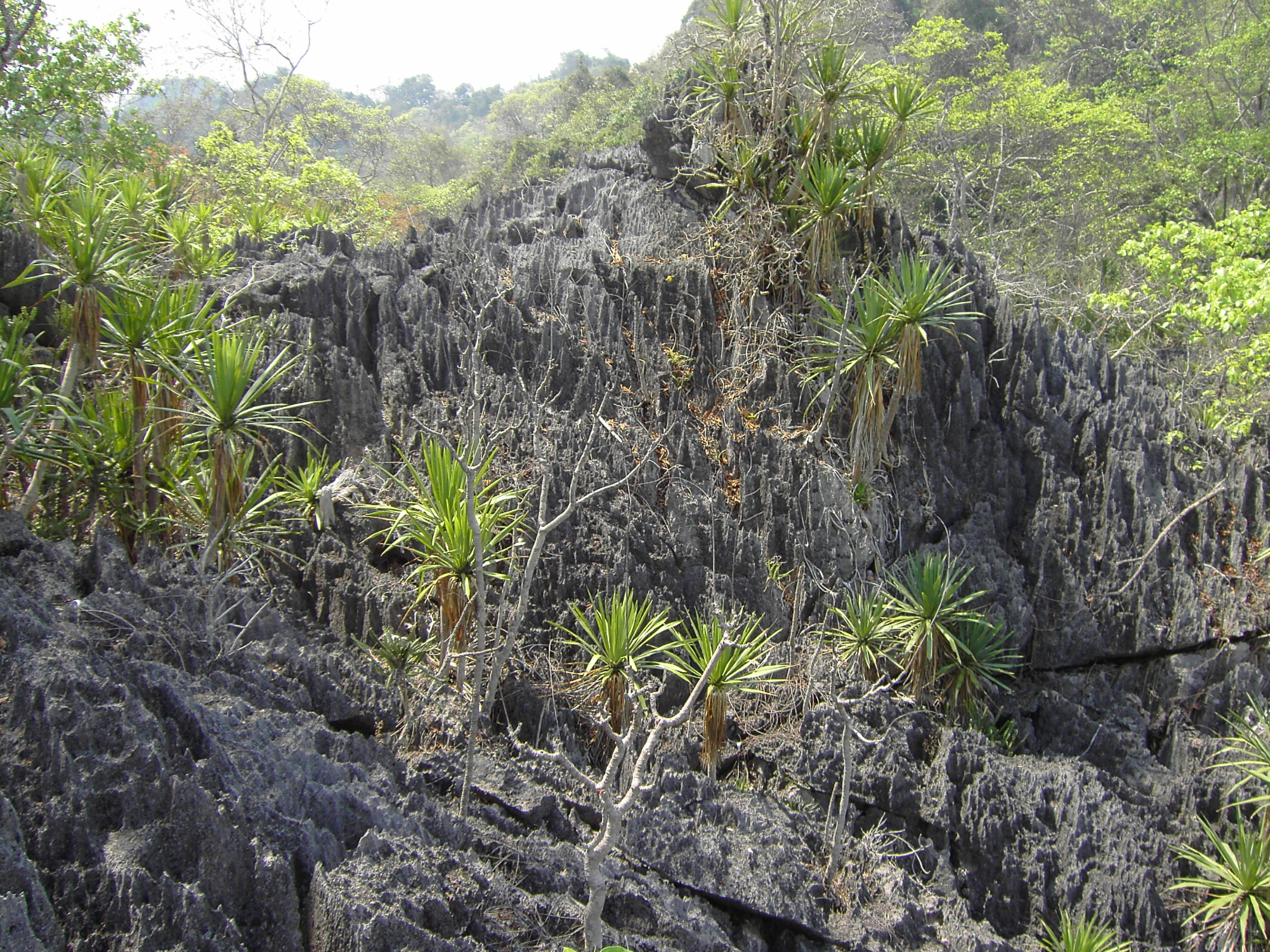
habitat (as "D. loureiri")

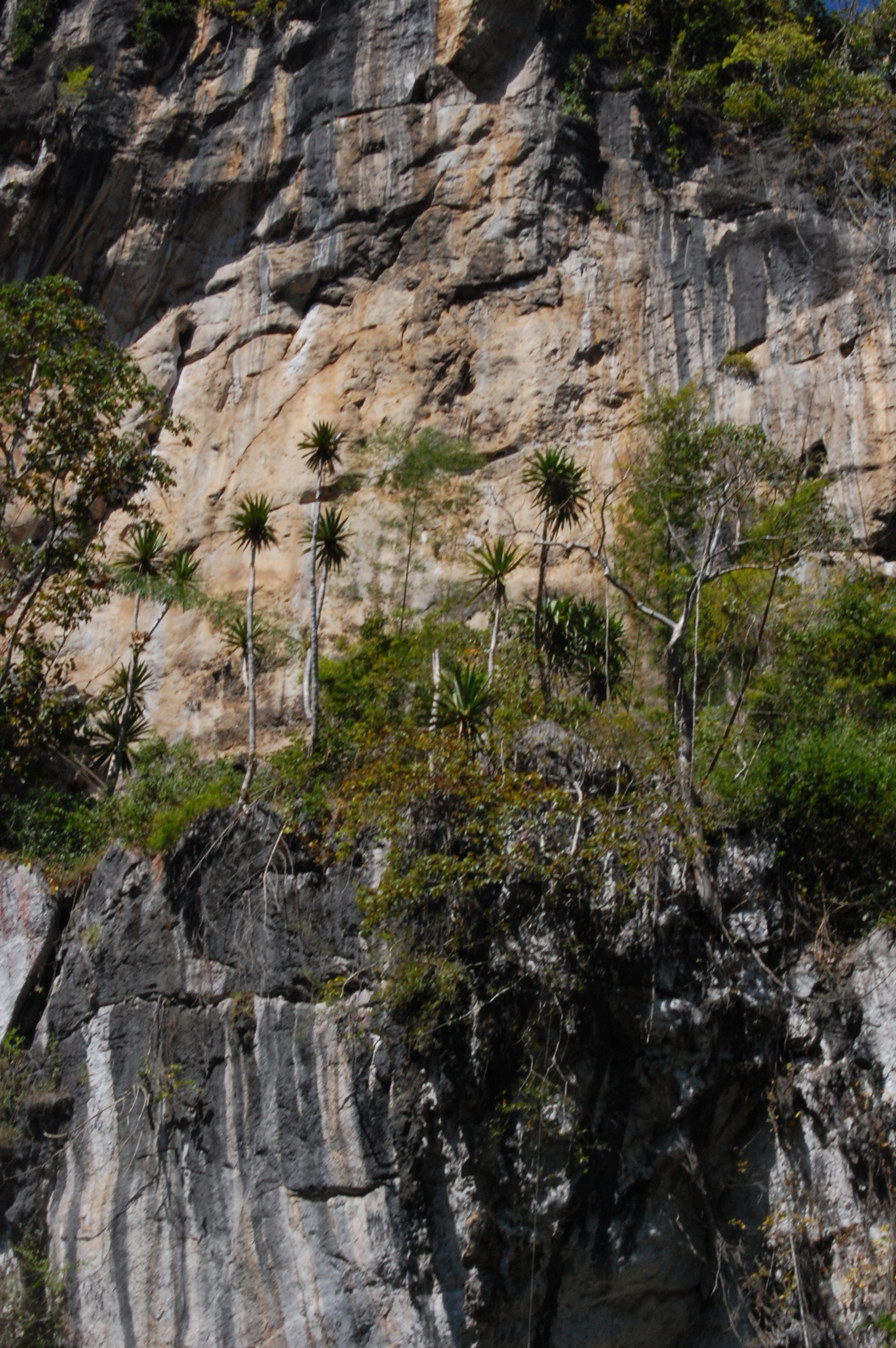

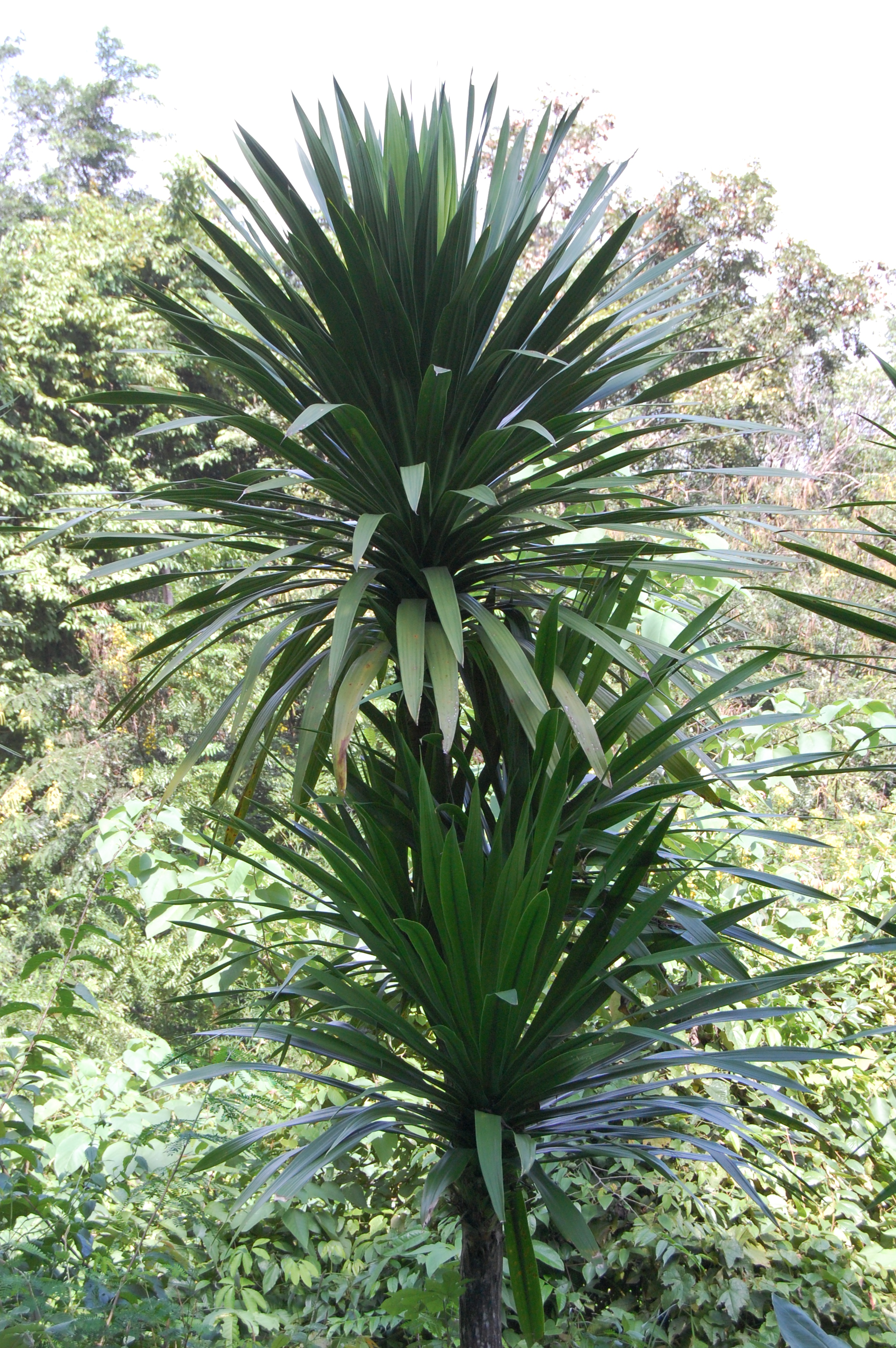

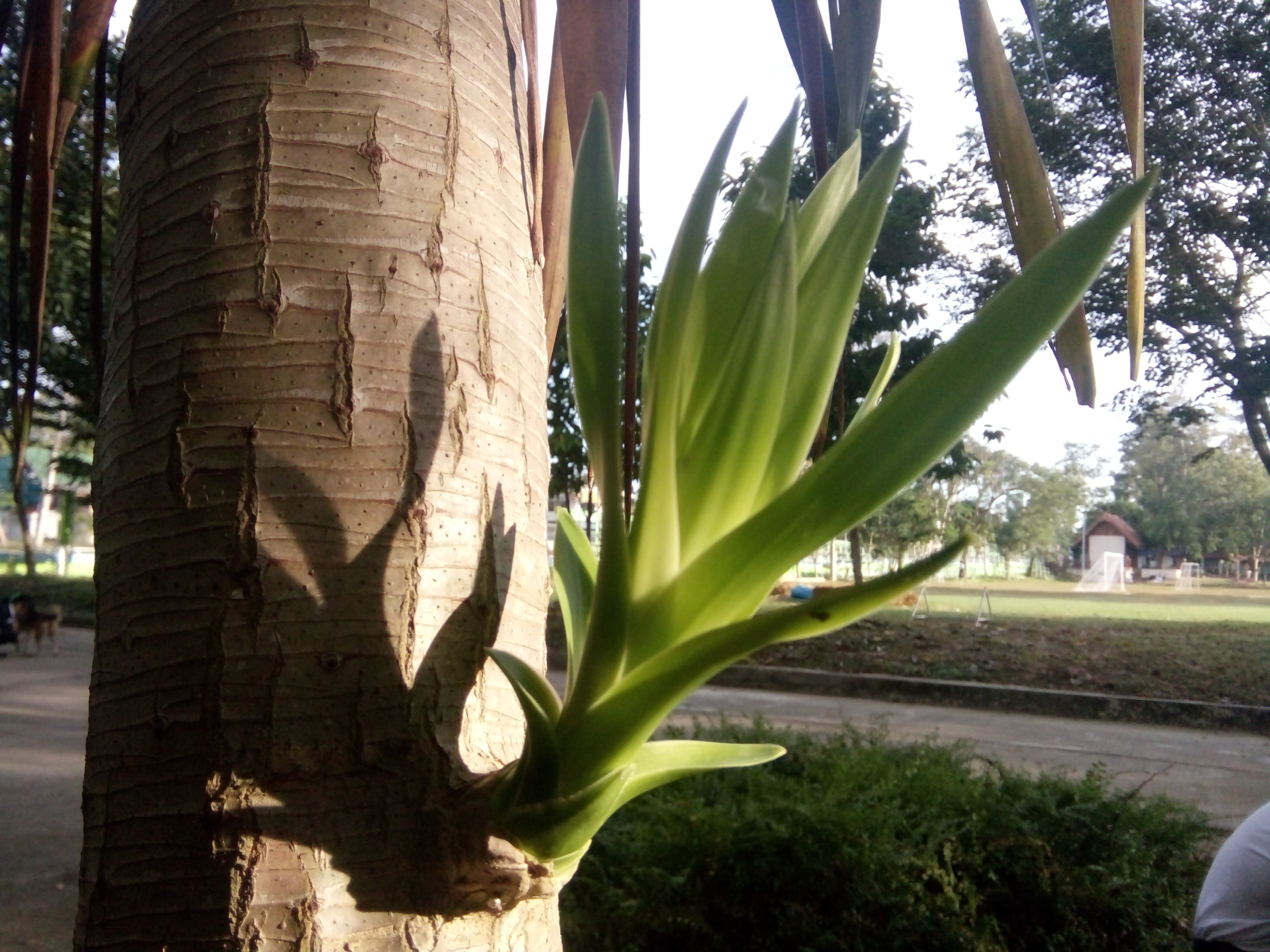
