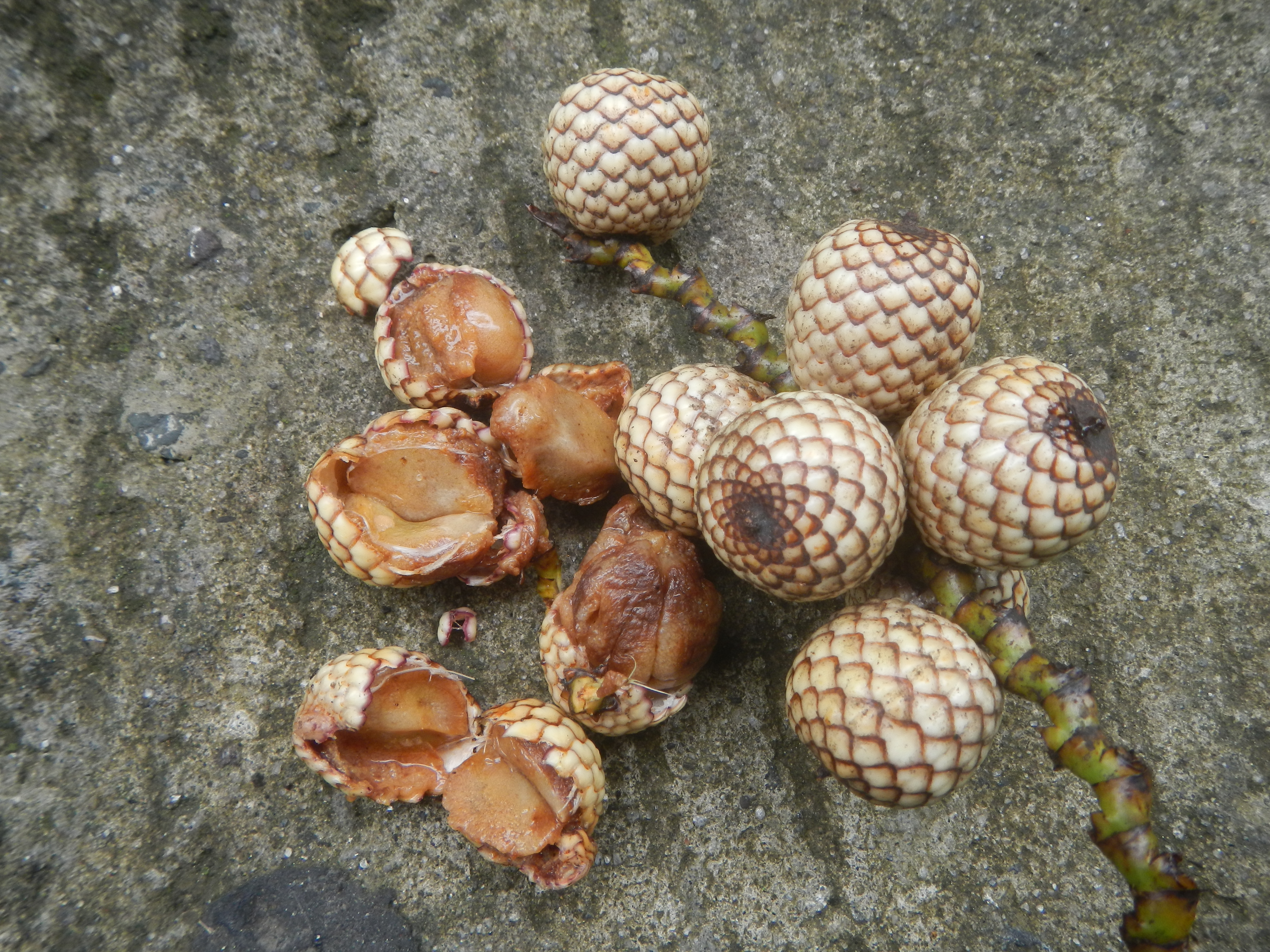

Scientific classification
- Kingdom: Plantae
- Clade: Tracheophytes
- Clade: Angiosperms
- Clade: Monocots
- Clade: Commelinids
- Order: Arecales
- Family: Arecaceae
- Subfamily: Calamoideae
- Tribe: Calameae
- Genus: Calamus
- Species: C. draco

Binomial name
- Calamus draco Willd.

Synonyms
- Calamus draconis Oken; Daemonorops draco (Willd.) Blume; Daemonorops rubra (Reinw. ex Blume) Mart.; Palmijuncus draco (Willd.) Kuntze

= Calamus draco =

Asian species of rattan plant

Calamus draco is an Asian species of rattan plant in the family Arecaceae; its native range is from peninsular Thailand to western Malesia. It is a source of the red resin known as dragon's blood, which is a pigment with medicinal uses. The compound 4'-demethyl-3,9-dihydroeucomine (DMDHE), derived from the resin of Daemonorops draco, the homotypic synonym for Calamus draco, is a natural bitter-masking substance. This compound, which masks the bitter taste, suggests the importance for the food, beverage, and pharmaceutical industries to improve the taste and acceptability of foods and medicines.

== Description ==
Calamus draco has stems in clusters forming individual rattan stems climbing up to 15 m., with sheaths to 30 mm diameter. Leaf fronds are described as cirrate (with a cirrus: extension of the rattan leaf tip armed with grappling hooks), produced from leaf-sheaths, which are bright green, bearing chocolate-coloured indumentum when young: they are 2.5 m long including petiole (up to 300 mm and armed with groups of short lateral spines to 6 mm long); the cirrus is about 1 m long. About 20 regularly arranged leaflets are on each side of the rachis. The mature fruit are more or less ovoid, 28 x 20 mm, covered in 16 vertical rows of scales and may be heavily encrusted with the "dragon's blood".

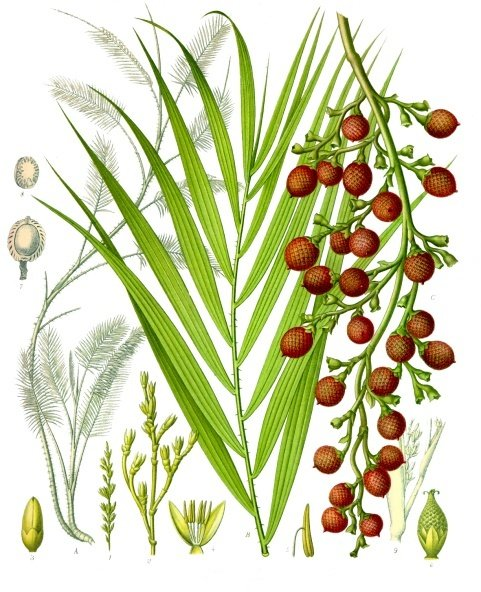

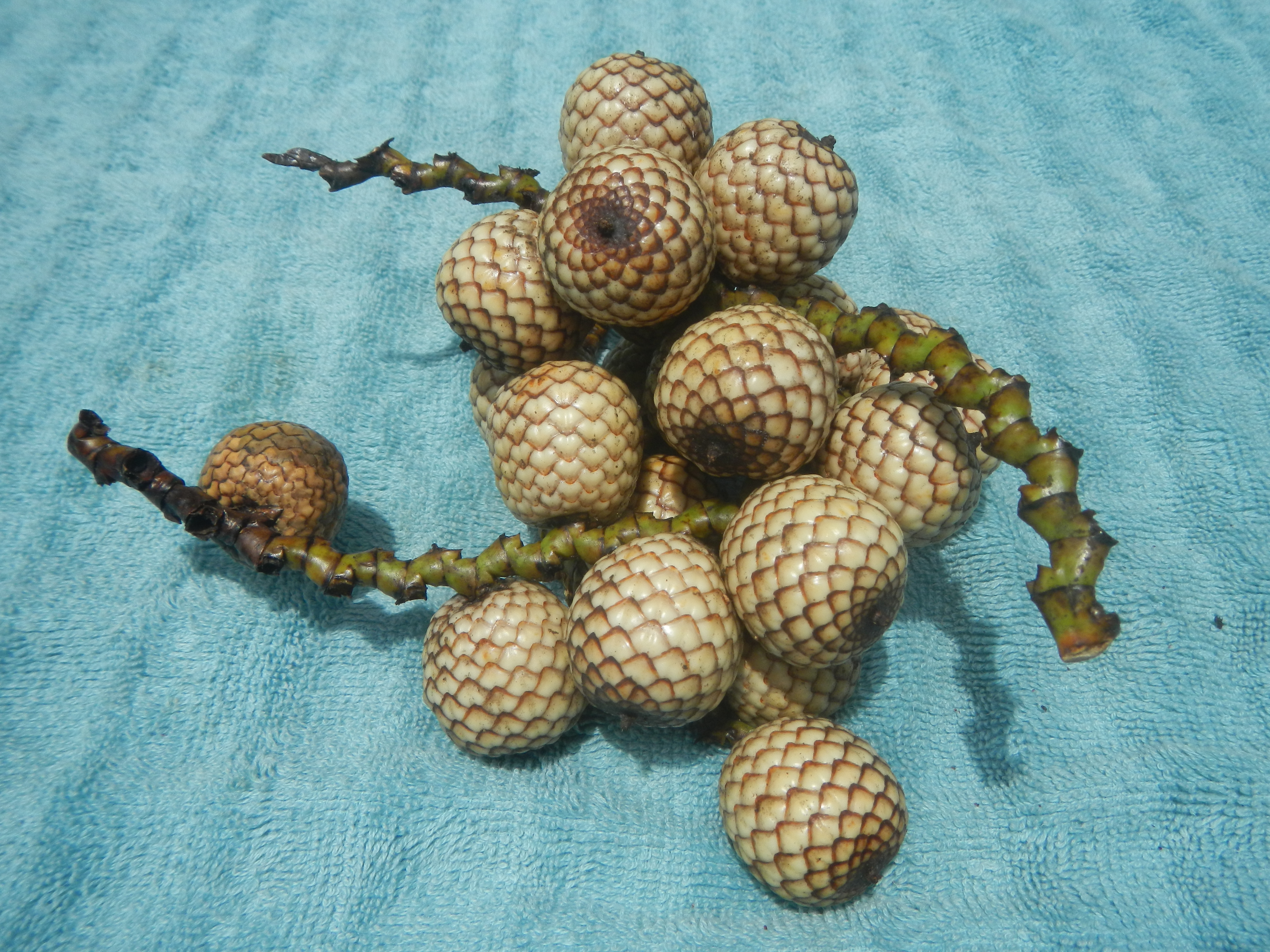

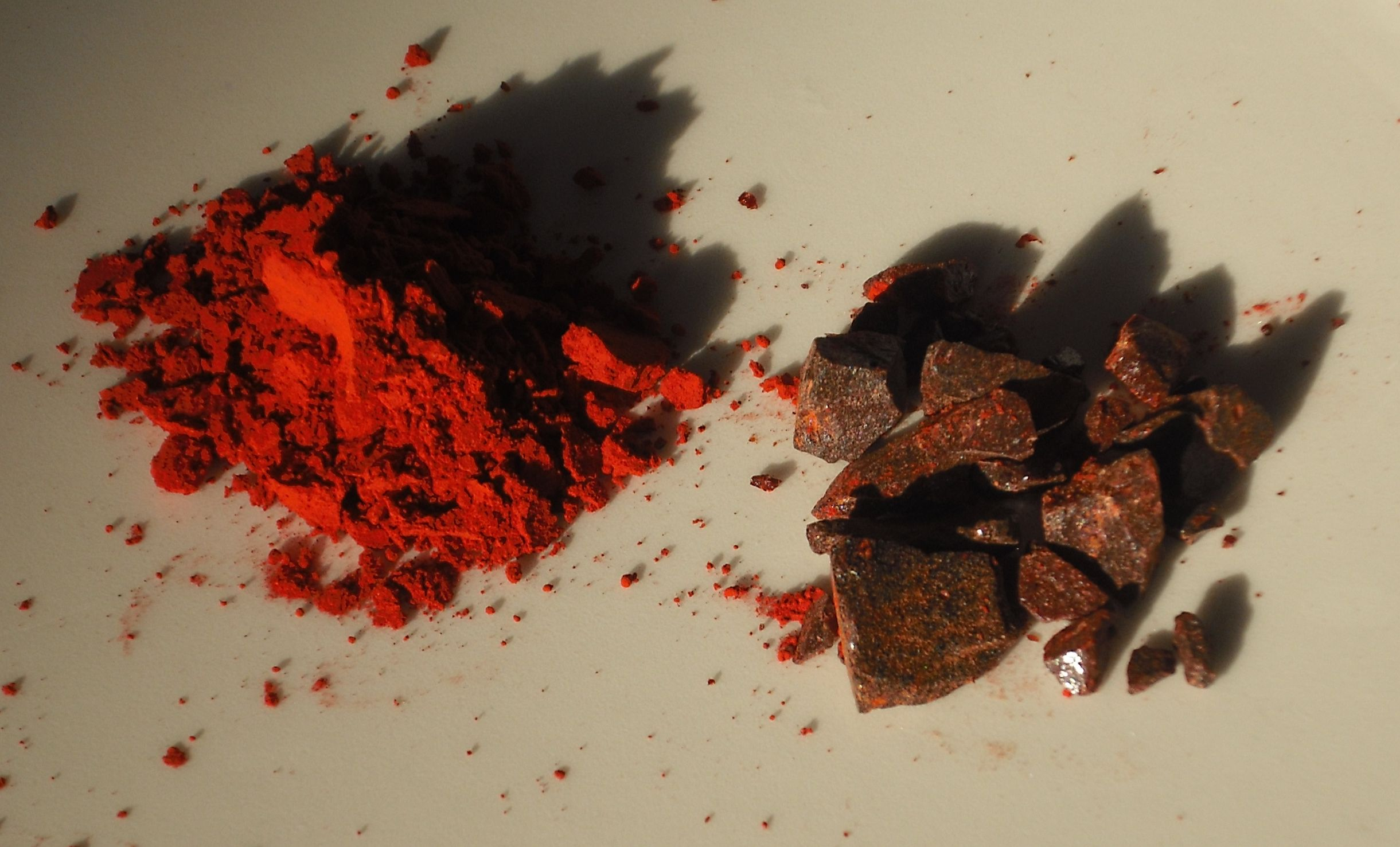
