= List of Arecaceae genera =

List of all genera of Arecaceae, palm trees

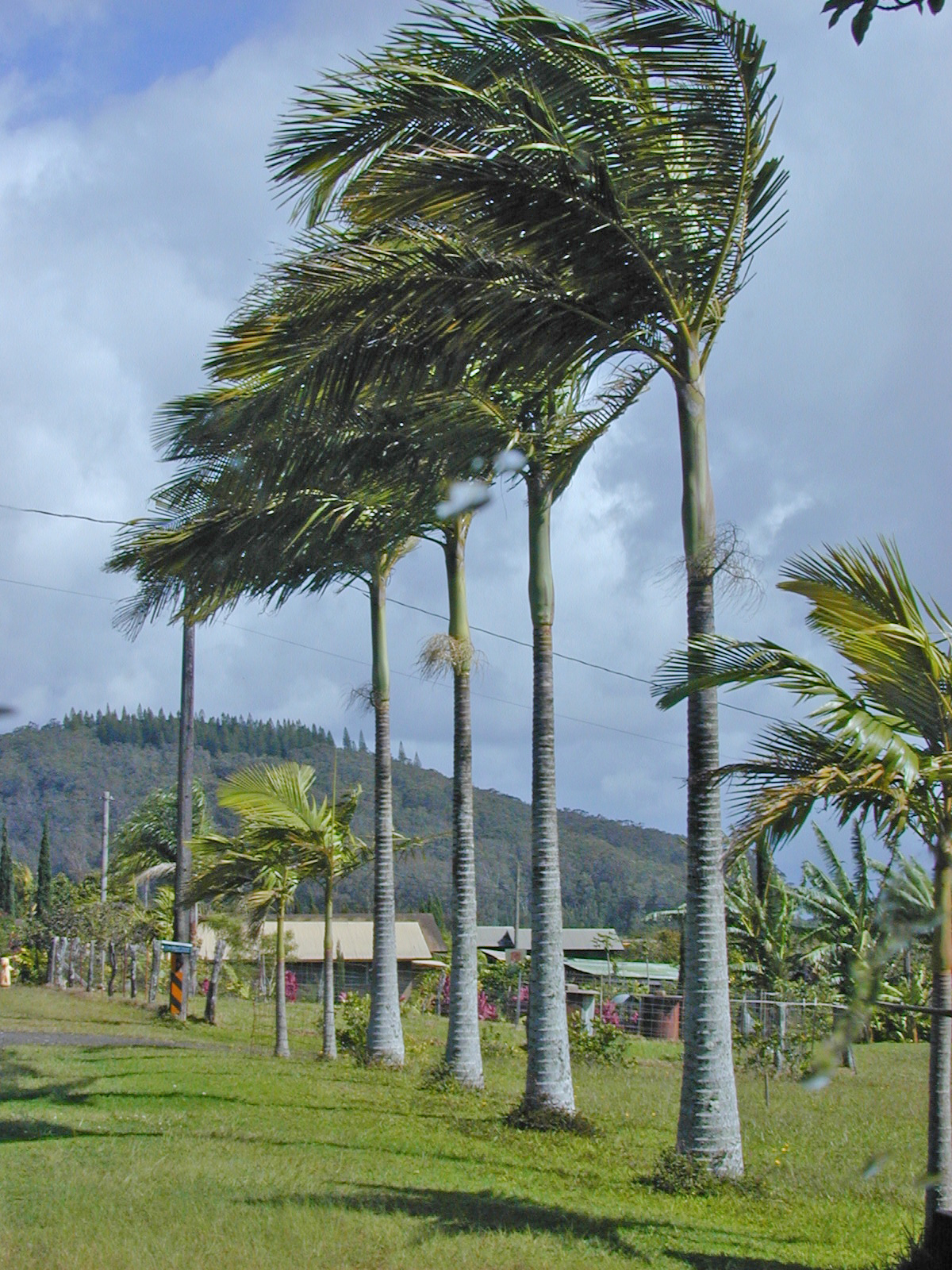
Alexander palm (Archontophoenix alexandrae) in strong wind

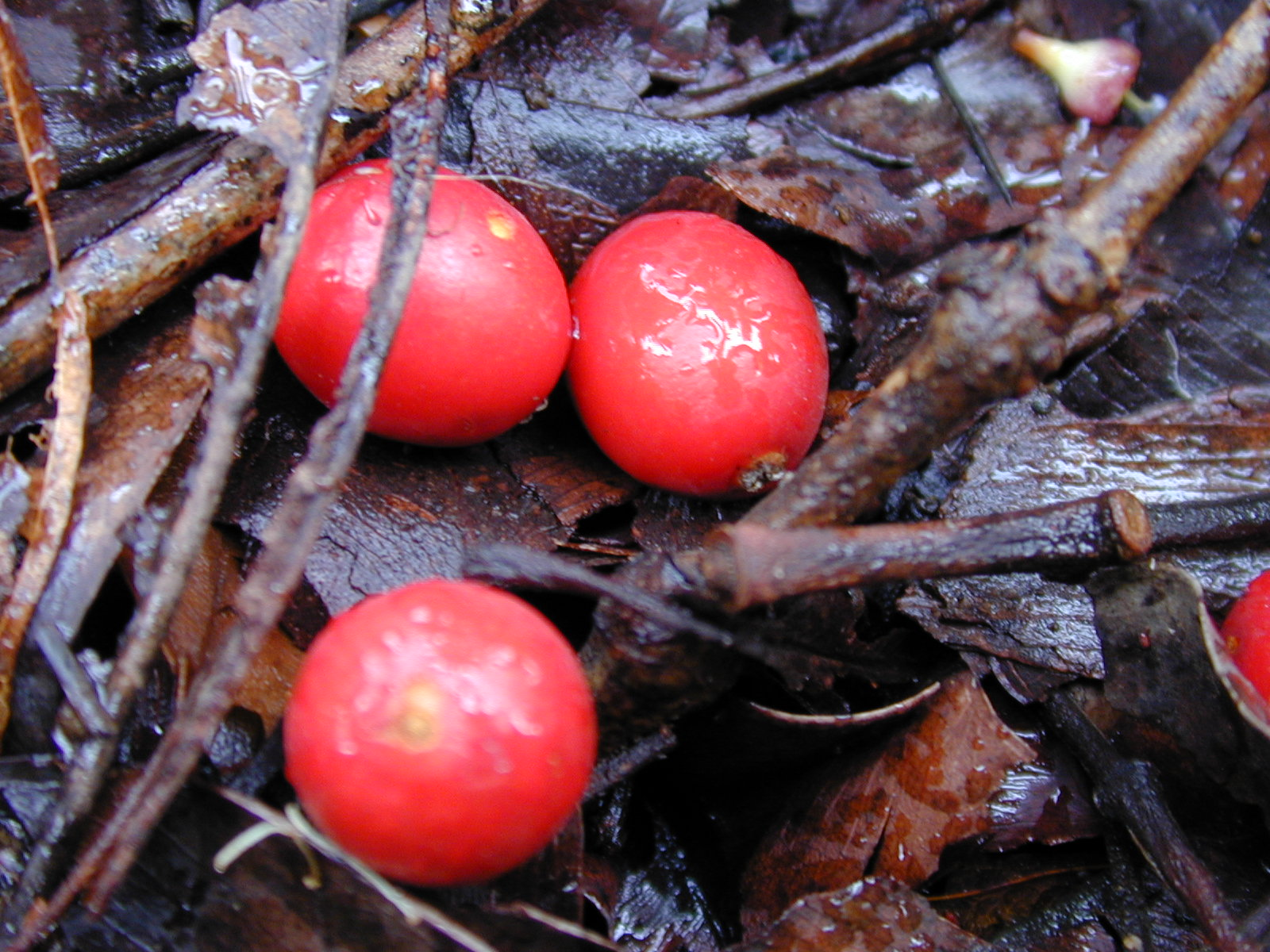
Alexander palm (Archontophoenix alexandrae) - fruit

This is a list of all the genera in the botanical family Arecaceae, the palm family, based on Baker & Dransfield (2016), which is a revised listing of genera given in the 2008 edition of Genera Palmarum.

== Taxonomy ==
This is a list of all the genera in the botanical family Arecaceae, the palm family, arranged by tribes and subtribes within the family.

Genera Palmarum (2008) lists 183 genera. Lanonia, Saribus, and the monotypic genera Jailoloa, Wallaceodoxa, Manjekia, and Sabinaria, which were described after 2008, have also been included below. Ceratolobus, Daemonorops, Pogonotium, Wallichia, Lytocaryum, and the monotypic genera Retispatha, Pritchardiopsis, and Solfia have since been removed from Genera Palmarum (2008) as obsolete genera. This brings the total number of genera to 181 as of 2016.

Phylogenetic tree of Arecaceae.

- Arecaceae
  - - - - Arecoideae
          - - - - - - - - Areceae
                        - Euterpeae
                      - Geonomateae
                    - Manicarieae
                  - - Pelagodoxeae
                    - Leopoldinieae
                - - - Cocoseae
                    - Reinhardtieae
                  - Roystoneeae
              - - - Podococceae
                  - Sclerospermeae
                - Oranieae
            - Chamaedoreeae
          - Iriarteeae
        - Ceroxyloideae
          - - Phytelepheae
            - Cyclospatheae
          - Ceroxyleae
      - Coryphoideae
        - - - Trachycarpeae
            - Phoeniceae
          - - Sabaleae
            - Cryosophileae
        - - - - Borasseae
              - Corypheae
            - Caryoteae
          - Chuniophoeniceae
    - Nypoideae
  - Calamoideae
    - - Calameae
      - Lepidocaryeae
    - Eugeissoneae

=== Subfamily Calamoideae ===
- Tribe Eugeissoneae
  - Eugeissona – Borneo, Malay Peninsula
- Tribe Lepidocaryeae – Africa and South America
  - Subtribe Ancistrophyllinae – Africa
    - Oncocalamus – Central Africa
    - Eremospatha – Africa
    - Laccosperma – Africa
  - Subtribe Raphiinae
    - Raphia – Africa, Madagascar, parts of South America
  - Subtribe Mauritiinae – northern South America
    - Lepidocaryum – central Amazon basin; monotypic genus
    - Mauritia – northern South America
    - Mauritiella – northern South America
- Tribe Calameae – Africa and Asia
  - Subtribe Korthalsiinae
    - Korthalsia – Malesia, New Guinea, Indochina
  - Subtribe Salaccinae – Malesia, Indochina
    - Eleiodoxa – Malay Peninsula, Sumatra, Borneo; monotypic genus
    - Salacca – Malesia, Indochina
  - Subtribe Metroxylinae
    - Metroxylon – New Guinea, Melanesia
  - Subtribe Pigafettinae
    - Pigafetta – Sulawesi, Moluccas and New Guinea
  - Subtribe Plectocomiinae – Malesia, Indochina
    - Plectocomia – Malesia, Indochina
    - Myrialepis – Malesia, Malay Peninsula, Sumatra; monotypic genus
    - Plectocomiopsis – Malesia, Indochina
  - Subtribe Calaminae – Africa, Asia
    - Calamus – Africa, Asia

Obsolete genera:

- Calospatha (synonym of Calamus) – Malay Peninsula
- Daemonorops (syn. of Calamus) – Malesia, Indochina
- Ceratolobus (syn. of Calamus) – Malay Peninsula, Sumatra, Borneo
- Pogonotium (syn. of Calamus) – northern Borneo

=== Subfamily Nypoideae ===
- Nypa

=== Subfamily Coryphoideae ===
- Tribe Sabaleae
  - Sabal – Caribbean, Gulf of Mexico, Mexico
- Tribe Cryosophileae – Americas
  - Schippia – Guatemala and Belize; monotypic genus
  - Trithrinax – south-central South America
  - Zombia – Hispaniola; monotypic genus
  - Coccothrinax – Caribbean
  - Hemithrinax – Cuba
  - Leucothrinax – northern Caribbean; monotypic genus
  - Thrinax – Caribbean and Central America
  - Chelyocarpus – Peru and nearby
  - Cryosophila – Central America
  - Itaya – Amazon basin; monotypic genus
  - Sabinaria – Colombia and Panama; monotypic genus
- Tribe Phoeniceae
  - Phoenix – Africa and Asia
- Tribe Trachycarpeae
  - Subtribe Rhapidinae
    - Chamaerops – Mediterranean; monotypic genus
    - Guihaia – Vietnam and China
    - Trachycarpus – southern China, northern Indochina, Himalayas
    - Rhapidophyllum – Florida; monotypic genus
    - Maxburretia – Malay Peninsula
    - Rhapis – Indochina, Aceh
  - Subtribe Livistoninae
    - Livistona – Indomalaya, Australasia, Gulf of Aden
    - Licuala – Indochina, Malesia, Melanesia
    - Johannesteijsmannia – Malay Peninsula and nearby parts of Sumatra and Borneo
    - Pholidocarpus – Malaysia, northern Indonesia
    - Saribus – Malesia, New Guinea, Island Melanesia
    - Lanonia – southern China, Indochina, Java
  - Unplaced members of Trachycarpeae
    - Acoelorraphe – Central America, Cuba, Bahamas, Florida; monotypic genus
    - Serenoa – Florida, US Gulf Coast except Texas; monotypic genus
    - Brahea – Mexico, Central America
    - Colpothrinax – Central America, Cuba
    - Copernicia – Greater Antilles, South America
    - Pritchardia – Polynesia
    - Washingtonia – Baja California, Colorado River region
- Tribe Chuniophoeniceae
  - Chuniophoenix – Vietnam, southern China
  - Kerriodoxa – southern Thailand; monotypic genus
  - Nannorrhops – SE Arabia, SE Iran, SW Pakistan; monotypic genus
  - Tahina – NW Madagascar; monotypic genus
- Tribe Caryoteae – Indomalaya, Australasia
  - Caryota – Indomalaya, Australasia
  - Arenga – Indomalaya, Australasia
- Tribe Corypheae
  - Corypha – Indomalaya, Australasia
- Tribe Borasseae – Africa and Asia
  - Subtribe Hyphaenieae – Africa, Indian Ocean
    - Bismarckia – W Madagascar; monotypic genus
    - Satranala – NE Madagascar; monotypic genus
    - Hyphaene – Africa, Indian Ocean
    - Medemia – Upper Nile (Sudan, Egypt); monotypic genus
  - Subtribe Lataniieae – Africa and Asia
    - Latania – Mascarenes
    - Lodoicea – Seychelles; monotypic genus
    - Borassodendron – Malay Peninsula, Borneo
    - Borassus – Africa and Asia

Obsolete genera:

- Pritchardiopsis – New Caledonia
- Wallichia – Indochina, Himalayas; accepted by Plants of the World Online as of April 2024

=== Subfamily Ceroxyloideae ===
- Tribe Cyclospatheae
  - Pseudophoenix – Greater Antilles and nearby
- Tribe Ceroxyleae
  - Ceroxylon – northern Andes
  - Juania – Juan Fernández Islands; monotypic genus
  - Oraniopsis – Queensland; monotypic genus
  - Ravenea – Madagascar and Comoros
- Tribe Phytelepheae – NW South America, Panama, Costa Rica
  - Ammandra – Colombia, Ecuador; monotypic genus
  - Aphandra – western Amazon basin; monotypic genus
  - Phytelephas – NW South America, Panama, Costa Rica

=== Subfamily Arecoideae ===
- Tribe Iriarteeae – northern South America
  - Iriartella – northern South America
  - Dictyocaryum – northern Andes, parts of Amazons
  - Iriartea – NW South America, Central America; monotypic genus
  - Socratea – northern South America, Central America
  - Wettinia – NW South America
- Tribe Chamaedoreeae – Americas, Mascarenes
  - Hyophorbe – Mascarenes
  - Wendlandiella – Peruvian Amazon
  - Synechanthus – Central America, Colombia, Ecuador
  - Chamaedorea – Central America, NW South America
  - Gaussia – Mexico, Belize, Cuba
- Tribe Podococceae
  - Podococcus – Nigeria, Cameroon, Equatorial Guinea
- Tribe Oranieae
  - Orania – Malesia, New Guinea, Madagascar
- Tribe Sclerospermeae
  - Sclerosperma – Central Africa
- Tribe Roystoneeae
  - Roystonea – Caribbean
- Tribe Reinhardtieae
  - Reinhardtia – Central America
- Tribe Cocoseae
  - Subtribe Attaleinae
    - Beccariophoenix – Madagascar
    - Jubaeopsis – South Africa; monotypic genus
    - Voanioala – NE Madagascar; monotypic genus
    - Allagoptera – Central South America
    - Attalea – Americas
    - Butia – SE South America
    - Cocos – cosmopolitan; monotypic genus
    - Jubaea – Chile; monotypic genus
    - Syagrus – South America
    - Parajubaea – Andes
  - Subtribe Bactridinae – Americas
    - Acrocomia – Americas
    - Astrocaryum – Americas
    - Aiphanes – NW South America, Caribbean
    - Bactris – South America, Central America, Caribbean
    - Desmoncus – South America, Central America
  - Subtribe Elaeidinae
    - Barcella – northern Brazil; monotypic genus
    - Elaeis – Africa, northern South America
- Tribe Manicarieae
  - Manicaria – northern South America
- Tribe Euterpeae – South America, Central America, Caribbean
  - Hyospathe – northern South America
  - Euterpe – South America, Central America
  - Prestoea – northern South America, Caribbean
  - Neonicholsonia – Central America; monotypic genus
  - Oenocarpus – South America
- Tribe Geonomateae – Americas
  - Welfia – Central America, Colombia, Ecuador
  - Pholidostachys – NW South America, Panama, Costa Rica
  - Calyptrogyne – Central America
  - Calyptronoma – Greater Antilles
  - Asterogyne – northern South America, Central America
  - Geonoma – Americas
- Tribe Leopoldinieae
  - Leopoldinia – Central Amazon basin
- Tribe Pelagodoxeae – New Guinea, Oceania
  - Pelagodoxa – Marquesas Islands; monotypic genus
  - Sommieria – NW New Guinea; monotypic genus
- Tribe Areceae – Malesia, Australasia, Madagascar
  - Subtribe Archontophoenicinae – New Guinea, Australia, New Caledonia
    - Actinorhytis – New Guinea; monotypic genus
    - Archontophoenix – eastern Australia
    - Actinokentia – New Caledonia
    - Chambeyronia – New Caledonia
    - Kentiopsis – New Caledonia
  - Subtribe Arecinae – Indochina, Malesia, New Guinea
    - Areca – Indochina, Malesia, New Guinea
    - Nenga – Malay Peninsula, Sumatra, Borneo, Java
    - Pinanga – Indochina, Malesia, New Guinea
  - Subtribe Basseliniinae – Island Melanesia
    - Basselinia – New Caledonia
    - Burretiokentia – New Caledonia
    - Cyphophoenix – New Caledonia
    - Cyphosperma – New Caledonia, Vanuatu, Fiji
    - Lepidorrhachis – Lord Howe Island; monotypic genus
    - Physokentia – Island Melanesia
  - Subtribe Carpoxylinae – Island Melanesia, Ryukyu Islands
    - Carpoxylon – northern Vanuatu; monotypic genus
    - Satakentia – Ryukyu Islands; monotypic genus
    - Neoveitchia – Vanuatu, Fiji
  - Subtribe Clinospermatinae – New Caledonia
    - Cyphokentia – New Caledonia
    - Clinosperma – New Caledonia
  - Subtribe Dypsidinae – Madagascar, Comoros
    - Dypsis – Madagascar, Comoros
    - Lemurophoenix – NE Madagascar; monotypic genus
    - Marojejya – E Madagascar
    - Masoala – E Madagascar
  - Subtribe Laccospadicinae – New Guinea, E Australia
    - Calyptrocalyx – New Guinea
    - Linospadix – New Guinea, E Australia
    - Howea – Lord Howe Island
    - Laccospadix – northern Queensland; monotypic genus
  - Subtribe Oncospermatinae – Malesia, Sri Lanka, Seychelles, Mascarenes
    - Oncosperma – Malesia
    - Deckenia – Seychelles; monotypic genus
    - Acanthophoenix – Mascarenes
    - Tectiphiala – Mauritius; monotypic genus
  - Subtribe Ptychospermatinae – Australasia
    - Ptychosperma – New Guinea, northern Australia
    - Ponapea – Caroline Islands, Bismarcks
    - Adonidia – Palawan
    - Balaka – Fiji, Samoa
    - Veitchia – Vanuatu, Fiji
    - Carpentaria – Northern Territory; monotypic genus
    - Wodyetia – northern Queensland; monotypic genus
    - Drymophloeus – NW New Guinea, Bismarcks, Solomon Islands, Samoa
    - Normanbya – northern Queensland; monotypic genus
    - Brassiophoenix – Papua New Guinea
    - Ptychococcus – New Guinea
    - Jailoloa – Halmahera; monotypic genus
    - Manjekia – Biak; monotypic genus
    - Wallaceodoxa – Raja Ampat Islands; monotypic genus
  - Subtribe Rhopalostylidinae – New Zealand
    - Rhopalostylis – New Zealand, Chatham Islands, Norfolk Island, and Kermadec Islands
    - Hedyscepe – Lord Howe Island; monotypic genus
  - Subtribe Verschaffeltiinae – Seychelles
    - Nephrosperma – Seychelles; monotypic genus
    - Phoenicophorium – Seychelles; monotypic genus
    - Roscheria – Seychelles; monotypic genus
    - Verschaffeltia – Seychelles; monotypic genus
  - Unplaced members of Areceae
    - Bentinckia – South India, Nicobars
    - Clinostigma – western Oceania
    - Cyrtostachys – Malesia, New Guinea, Solomon Islands
    - Dictyosperma – Mascarenes; monotypic genus
    - Dransfieldia – West Papua; monotypic genus
    - Heterospathe – Philippines, New Guinea, Island Melanesia
    - Hydriastele – Australasia
    - Iguanura – Malay Peninsula, Sumatra, Borneo
    - Loxococcus – Sri Lanka; monotypic genus
    - Rhopaloblaste – New Guinea, Solomon Islands, Malay Peninsula, Nicobar Islands

Obsolete genera:

- Lytocaryum – Brazil
- Solfia – Samoa

== Geographical distributions ==
Below are geographical distributions of all the genera in the botanical family Arecaceae, following the 2008 edition of Genera Palmarum (pp. 647–650).

Islands and archipelagos with large numbers of endemic genera include New Caledonia, Lord Howe Island, New Guinea, Sri Lanka, Madagascar, Seychelles, and the Mascarenes.

=== Old World ===
Arabia

- Hyphaene
- Livistona
- Nannorrhops
- Phoenix

Australia (see also Lord Howe Island)

- Archontophoenix
- Arenga
- Calamus
- Carpentaria
- Caryota
- Cocos
- Corypha
- Hydriastele
- Laccospadix
- Licuala
- Linospadix
- Livistona
- Normanbya
- Nypa
- Oraniopsis
- Ptychosperma
- Wodyetia

Borneo

- Adonidia
- Areca
- Arenga
- Borassodendron
- Calamus
- Caryota
- Corypha
- Cyrtostachys
- Eleiodoxa
- Eugeissona
- Iguanura
- Johannesteijsmannia
- Korthalsia
- Licuala
- Livistona
- Nenga
- Nypa
- Oncosperma
- Orania
- Pholidocarpus
- Pinanga
- Plectocomia
- Plectocomiopsis
- Salacca

China

- Arenga
- Borassus
- Calamus
- Caryota
- Chuniophoenix
- Corypha
- Guihaia
- Lanonia
- Licuala
- Livistona
- Nypa
- Phoenix
- Pinanga
- Plectocomia
- Rhapis
- Salacca
- Trachycarpus
- Wallichia

Europe, North Africa, Egypt, Asia Minor

- Chamaerops
- Hyphaene
- Medemia
- Phoenix

Fiji and Samoa

- Balaka
- Calamus
- Clinostigma
- Cyphosperma
- Drymophloeus
- Heterospathe
- Metroxylon
- Neoveitchia
- Physokentia
- Pritchardia
- Solfia
- Veitchia

Hawaii

- Pritchardia

India, including Andamans and Nicobars

- Areca
- Arenga
- Bentinckia
- Borassus
- Calamus
- Caryota
- Corypha
- Hyphaene
- Korthalsia
- Licuala
- Livistona
- Nannorrhops
- Nypa
- Phoenix
- Pinanga
- Plectocomia
- Rhopaloblaste
- Trachycarpus
- Wallichia

Indochina

- Areca
- Arenga
- Borassus
- Calamus
- Caryota
- Corypha
- Chuniophoenix
- Guihaia
- Korthalsia
- Licuala
- Livistona
- Myrialepis
- Nenga
- Nypa
- Oncosperma
- Phoenix
- Pinanga
- Plectocomia
- Plectocomiopsis
- Rhapis
- Salacca
- Trachycarpus
- Wallichia

Iran, Afghanistan, Pakistan

- Hyphaene
- Nannorrhops
- Phoenix

Java

- Areca
- Arenga
- Borassus
- Calamus
- Caryota
- Corypha
- Korthalsia
- Lanonia
- Licuala
- Livistona
- Nenga
- Nypa
- Oncosperma
- Orania
- Pinanga
- Plectocomia
- Salacca

Lesser Sunda Islands

- Borassus
- Calamus
- Caryota
- Corypha
- Licuala
- Nypa

Lord Howe Island

- Hedyscepe
- Howea
- Lepidorrhachis

Madagascar and Comoros

- Beccariophoenix
- Bismarckia
- Borassus
- Chrysalidocarpus
- Dypsis
- Elaeis
- Hyphaene
- Lemurophoenix
- Marojejya
- Masoala
- Orania
- Phoenix
- Raphia
- Ravenea
- Satranala
- Tahina
- Voanioala

Malay Peninsula

- Areca
- Arenga
- Borassodendron
- Calamus
- Caryota
- Corypha
- Cyrtostachys
- Eleiodoxa
- Eugeissona
- Iguanura
- Johannesteijsmannia
- Korthalsia
- Licuala
- Livistona
- Maxburretia
- Myrialepis
- Nenga
- Nypa
- Oncosperma
- Orania
- Phoenix
- Pholidocarpus
- Pinanga
- Plectocomia
- Plectocomiopsis
- Rhopaloblaste
- Salacca

Marquesas

- Pelagodoxa

Mascarenes

- Acanthophoenix
- Corypha
- Dictyosperma
- Hyophorbe
- Latania
- Tectiphiala

Micronesia

- Clinostigma
- Heterospathe
- Hydriastele
- Livistona
- Metroxylon
- Nypa
- Pinanga
- Ponapea

Moluccas

- Areca
- Arenga
- Borassus
- Calamus
- Calyptrocalyx
- Caryota
- Corypha
- Drymophloeus
- Heterospathe
- Hydriastele
- Jailoloa
- Licuala
- Livistona
- Metroxylon
- Nypa
- Oncosperma
- Orania
- Pholidocarpus
- Pigafetta
- Pinanga
- Ptychosperma
- Rhopaloblaste
- Wallaceodoxa

Myanmar

- Areca
- Arenga
- Borassus
- Calamus
- Caryota
- Corypha
- Korthalsia
- Licuala
- Livistona
- Myrialepis
- Nypa
- Oncosperma
- Phoenix
- Pinanga
- Plectocomia
- Salacca
- Trachycarpus
- Wallichia

New Caledonia

- Actinokentia
- Basselinia
- Burretiokentia
- Chambeyronia
- Clinosperma
- Cyphokentia
- Cyphophoenix
- Cyphosperma
- Kentiopsis
- Pritchardiopsis

New Guinea and the Bismarck Archipelago

- Actinorhytis
- Areca
- Arenga
- Borassus
- Brassiophoenix
- Calamus
- Calyptrocalyx
- Caryota
- Clinostigma
- Corypha
- Cyrtostachys
- Dransfieldia
- Drymophloeus
- Heterospathe
- Hydriastele
- Korthalsia
- Licuala
- Linospadix
- Livistona
- Metroxylon
- Nypa
- Orania
- Physokentia
- Pigafetta
- Pinanga
- Ptychococcus
- Ptychosperma
- Rhopaloblaste
- Sommieria

New Hebrides

- Calamus
- Carpoxylon
- Caryota
- Clinostigma
- Cyphosperma
- Heterospathe
- Hydriastele
- Licuala
- Metroxylon
- Neoveitchia
- Physokentia
- Veitchia

New Zealand

- Rhopalostylis

Philippines

- Adonidia
- Areca
- Arenga
- Livistona
- Calamus
- Caryota
- Cocos
- Corypha
- Heterospathe
- Korthalsia
- Licuala
- Nypa
- Oncosperma
- Orania
- Phoenix
- Pinanga
- Plectocomia
- Salacca

Ryukyu Islands

- Arenga
- Livistona
- Nypa
- Phoenix
- Satakentia

Seychelles

- Deckenia
- Lodoicea
- Nephrosperma
- Phoenicophorium
- Roscheria
- Verschaffeltia

Solomon Islands

- Actinorhytis
- Areca
- Calamus
- Caryota
- Clinostigma
- Cyrtostachys
- Drymophloeus
- Heterospathe
- Hydriastele
- Licuala
- Livistona
- Metroxylon
- Nypa
- Physokentia
- Ptychosperma
- Rhopaloblaste

Sri Lanka (Ceylon)

- Areca
- Borassus
- Calamus
- Caryota
- Corypha
- Loxococcus
- Oncosperma
- Phoenix

Sulawesi

- Areca
- Arenga
- Borassus
- Calamus
- Caryota
- Corypha
- Hydriastele
- Korthalsia
- Licuala
- Livistona
- Nypa
- Oncosperma
- Orania
- Pholidocarpus
- Pigafetta
- Pinanga

Sumatra

- Areca
- Arenga
- Calamus
- Caryota
- Corypha
- Cyrtostachys
- Eleiodoxa
- Iguanura
- Johannesteijsmannia
- Korthalsia
- Licuala
- Livistona
- Myrialepis
- Nenga
- Nypa
- Oncosperma
- Orania
- Phoenix
- Pholidocarpus
- Pinanga
- Plectocomia
- Plectocomiopsis
- Rhapis
- Salacca

Thailand

- Areca
- Arenga
- Borassodendron
- Borassus
- Calamus
- Caryota
- Corypha
- Cyrtostachys
- Eleiodoxa
- Eugeissona
- Iguanura
- Johannesteijsmannia
- Kerriodoxa
- Korthalsia
- Licuala
- Livistona
- Maxburretia
- Myrialepis
- Nenga
- Nypa
- Oncosperma
- Orania
- Phoenix
- Pinanga
- Plectocomia
- Plectocomiopsis
- Rhapis
- Salacca
- Trachycarpus
- Wallichia

==== Africa ====
Sub-Saharan Africa (i.e., Africa, but excluding North Africa) has 16 genera and 65 species.

Tropical West Africa

- Borassus
- Elaeis
- Eremospatha
- Hyphaene
- Laccosperma
- Oncocalamus
- Phoenix
- Podococcus
- Raphia
- Sclerosperma

Tropical East Africa

- Borassus
- Chrysalidocarpus
- Dictyosperma
- Dypsis
- Elaeis
- Eremospatha
- Hyphaene
- Hyophorbe
- Laccosperma
- Latania
- Livistona
- Medemia
- Phoenix
- Raphia

Southern Africa

- Borassus
- Hyphaene
- Jubaeopsis
- Phoenix
- Raphia

=== New World ===
There are 65 genera and 730 species in the New World.

Argentina

- Acrocomia
- Allagoptera
- Butia
- Copernicia
- Euterpe
- Syagrus
- Trithrinax

Bolivia

- Acrocomia
- Aiphanes
- Astrocaryum
- Attalea
- Bactris
- Ceroxylon
- Chamaedorea
- Chelyocarpus
- Copernicia
- Desmoncus
- Dictyocaryum
- Euterpe
- Geonoma
- Hyospathe
- Iriartea
- Iriartella
- Mauritia
- Mauritiella
- Oenocarpus
- Parajubaea
- Phytelephas
- Prestoea
- Socratea
- Syagrus
- Trithrinax
- Wendlandiella
- Wettinia

Brazil

- Acrocomia
- Aiphanes
- Aphandra
- Attalea
- Allagoptera
- Astrocaryum
- Bactris
- Barcella
- Butia
- Chamaedorea
- Chelyocarpus
- Copernicia
- Desmoncus
- Dictyocaryum
- Elaeis
- Euterpe
- Geonoma
- Hyospathe
- Iriartea
- Iriartella
- Itaya
- Leopoldinia
- Lepidocaryum
- Manicaria
- Mauritia
- Mauritiella
- Oenocarpus
- Pholidostachys
- Phytelephas
- Prestoea
- Raphia
- Socratea
- Syagrus
- Trithrinax
- Wendlandiella
- Wettinia

Central America

- Acoelorraphe
- Acrocomia
- Aiphanes
- Asterogyne
- Astrocaryum
- Attalea
- Bactris
- Brahea
- Calyptrogyne
- Chamaedorea
- Colpothrinax
- Cryosophila
- Desmoncus
- Elaeis
- Euterpe
- Gaussia
- Geonoma
- Hyospathe
- Iriartea
- Manicaria
- Neonicholsonia
- Oenocarpus
- Pholidostachys
- Phytelephas
- Prestoea
- Pseudophoenix
- Raphia
- Reinhardtia
- Roystonea
- Sabal
- Schippia
- Socratea
- Synechanthus
- Welfia

Chile (see also Juan Fernández Islands)

- Jubaea

Colombia

- Acrocomia
- Aiphanes
- Ammandra
- Asterogyne
- Astrocaryum
- Attalea
- Bactris
- Calyptrogyne
- Ceroxylon
- Chamaedorea
- Chelyocarpus
- Copernicia
- Cryosophila
- Desmoncus
- Dictyocaryum
- Elaeis
- Euterpe
- Geonoma
- Iriartea
- Iriartella
- Itaya
- Hyospathe
- Leopoldinia
- Lepidocaryum
- Manicaria
- Mauritia
- Mauritiella
- Oenocarpus
- Pholidostachys
- Phytelephas
- Prestoea
- Raphia
- Reinhardtia
- Roystonea
- Sabal
- Sabinaria
- Socratea
- Syagrus
- Synechanthus
- Welfia
- Wettinia

Ecuador

- Aiphanes
- Aphandra
- Astrocaryum
- Attalea
- Bactris
- Ceroxylon
- Chamaedorea
- Chelyocarpus
- Desmoncus
- Dictyocaryum
- Elaeis
- Euterpe
- Geonoma
- Hyospathe
- Iriartea
- Manicaria
- Mauritia
- Mauritiella
- Oenocarpus
- Parajubaea
- Pholidostachys
- Phytelephas
- Prestoea
- Socratea
- Syagrus
- Synechanthus
- Welfia
- Wettinia

Greater Antilles (Cuba, Hispaniola, Jamaica, Puerto Rico)

- Acoelorraphe
- Acrocomia
- Attalea
- Bactris
- Calyptronoma
- Coccothrinax
- Colpothrinax
- Copernicia
- Gaussia
- Geonoma
- Hemithrinax
- Leucothrinax
- Prestoea
- Pseudophoenix
- Roystonea
- Sabal
- Thrinax
- Zombia

Guianas

- Acrocomia
- Astrocaryum
- Attalea
- Bactris
- Desmoncus
- Dictyocaryum
- Elaeis
- Euterpe
- Geonoma
- Hyospathe
- Iriartella
- Lepidocaryum
- Manicaria
- Mauritia
- Mauritiella
- Oenocarpus
- Prestoea
- Roystonea
- Socratea
- Syagrus

Juan Fernández Islands

- Juania

Lesser Antilles

- Acrocomia
- Aiphanes
- Coccothrinax
- Desmoncus
- Euterpe
- Geonoma
- Leucothrinax
- Prestoea
- Pseudophoenix
- Roystonea
- Sabal
- Syagrus

Mexico

- Acoelorraphe
- Acrocomia
- Astrocaryum
- Attalea
- Bactris
- Brahea
- Calyptrogyne
- Chamaedorea
- Coccothrinax
- Cryosophila
- Desmoncus
- Gaussia
- Geonoma
- Pseudophoenix
- Reinhardtia
- Roystonea
- Sabal
- Synechanthus
- Thrinax
- Washingtonia

Paraguay

- Acrocomia
- Allagoptera
- Attalea
- Bactris
- Butia
- Copernicia
- Geonoma
- Syagrus
- Trithrinax

Peru

- Aiphanes
- Aphandra
- Astrocaryum
- Attalea
- Bactris
- Ceroxylon
- Chamaedorea
- Chelyocarpus
- Desmoncus
- Dictyocaryum
- Euterpe
- Geonoma
- Hyospathe
- Iriartella
- Iriartea
- Itaya
- Lepidocaryum
- Mauritia
- Mauritiella
- Oenocarpus
- Pholidostachys
- Phytelephas
- Prestoea
- Socratea
- Syagrus
- Wendlandiella
- Wettinia

Uruguay

- Butia
- Syagrus
- Trithrinax

USA (continental)

- Acoelorraphe
- Coccothrinax
- Leucothrinax
- Pseudophoenix
- Rhapidophyllum
- Roystonea
- Sabal
- Serenoa
- Thrinax
- Washingtonia

Venezuela, Trinidad and Tobago

- Acrocomia
- Aiphanes
- Asterogyne
- Astrocaryum
- Attalea
- Bactris
- Ceroxylon
- Chamaedorea
- Coccothrinax
- Copernicia
- Desmoncus
- Dictyocaryum
- Euterpe
- Geonoma
- Hyospathe
- Iriartea
- Iriartella
- Leopoldinia
- Lepidocaryum
- Manicaria
- Mauritia
- Mauritiella
- Oenocarpus
- Prestoea
- Roystonea
- Sabal
- Socratea
- Syagrus
- Wettinia

== Extinct genera ==
- Paschalococos – Extinct in around AD 800 to 1600
- Latanites – Middle Eocene to Early-Middle Oligocene
- Palaeoraphe – Miocene to around late Pliocene or early Pleistocene
- Palmoxylon – Late Cretaceous to Miocene
- Phoenicites – Cretaceous to Miocene
- Sabalites – Late Cretaceous to Miocene
- Uhlia – Early Eocene

== See also ==
- List of Arecaceae genera by alphabetical order
- Climbing palm
- Fan palm
- List of hardy palms
