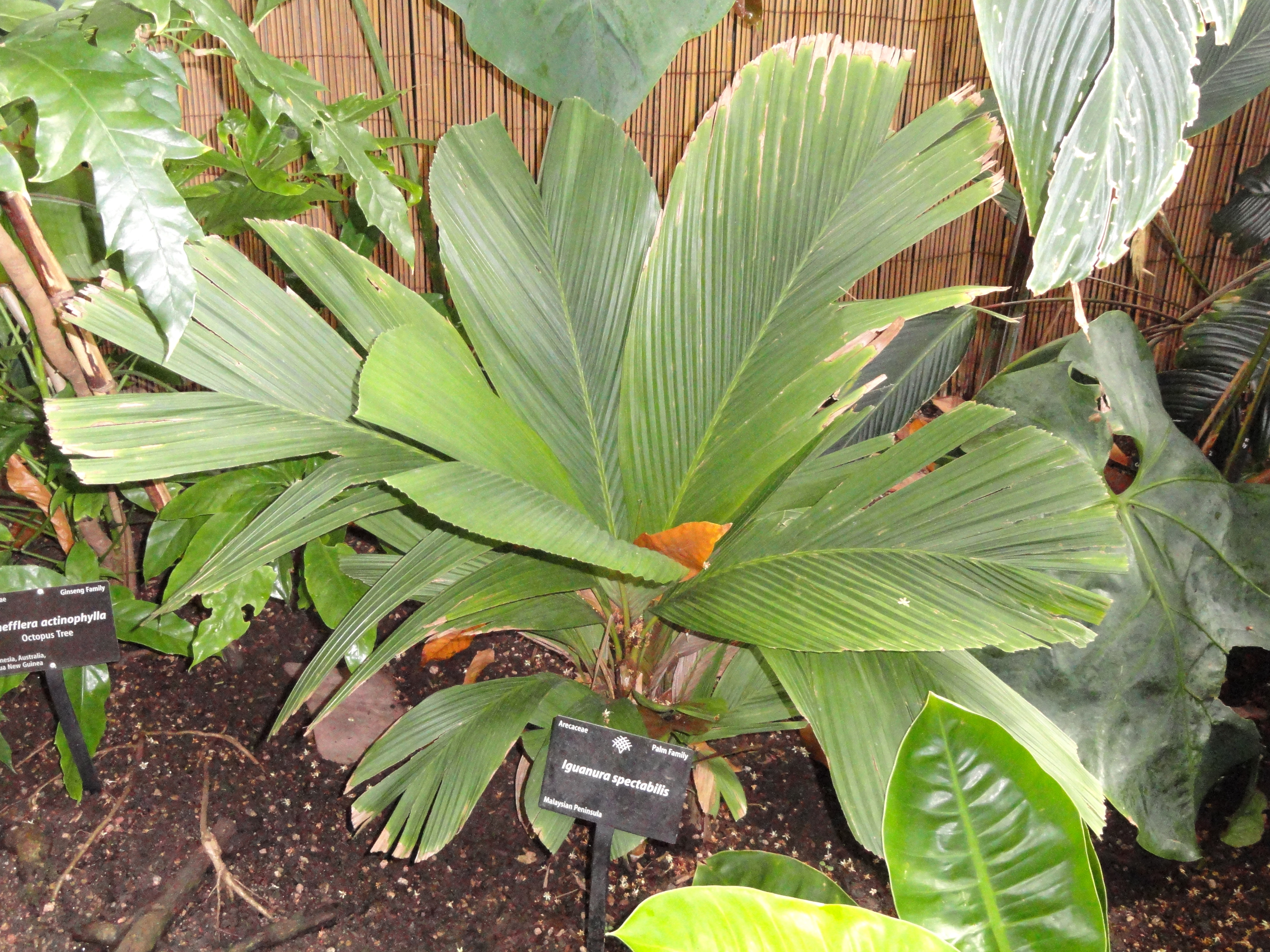

Scientific classification
- Kingdom: Plantae
- Clade: Tracheophytes
- Clade: Angiosperms
- Clade: Monocots
- Clade: Commelinids
- Order: Arecales
- Family: Arecaceae
- Subfamily: Arecoideae
- Tribe: Areceae
- Subtribe: Iguanurinae; Benth. & Hook.f.

Genera
- Actinorhytis; Alloschmidia; Basselinia; Bentinckia; Brongniartikentia; Burretiokentia; Campecarpus; Carpoxylon; Clinosperma; Clinostigma; Cyphokentia; Cyphophoenix; Cyphosperma; Dictyosperma; Heterospathe; Iguanura; Lavoixia; Lepidorrhachis; Moratia; Neoveitchia; Pelagodoxa; Physokentia; Rhopaloblaste; Satakentia; Sommieria; Veillonia

= Iguanurinae =

Subtribe of palms

Iguanurinae is a palm tree subtribe in the tribe Areceae. It is not recognized in recent classifications.
