= Euterpeinae =

Scientific classification
- Kingdom: Plantae
- Clade: Tracheophytes
- Clade: Angiosperms
- Clade: Monocots
- Clade: Commelinids
- Order: Arecales
- Family: Arecaceae
- Subfamily: Arecoideae
- Tribe: Areceae
- Subtribe: Euterpeinae; Griseb.

Genera
- Euterpe; Hyospathe; Neonicholsonia; Oenocarpus; Prestoea

Subtribe of palms

Euterpeinae is a palm tree subtribe in the tribe Areceae.
