= Elaeidinae =

Scientific classification
- Kingdom: Plantae
- Clade: Tracheophytes
- Clade: Angiosperms
- Clade: Monocots
- Clade: Commelinids
- Order: Arecales
- Family: Arecaceae
- Subfamily: Arecoideae
- Tribe: Cocoseae
- Subtribe: Elaeidinae

Tribe of palms

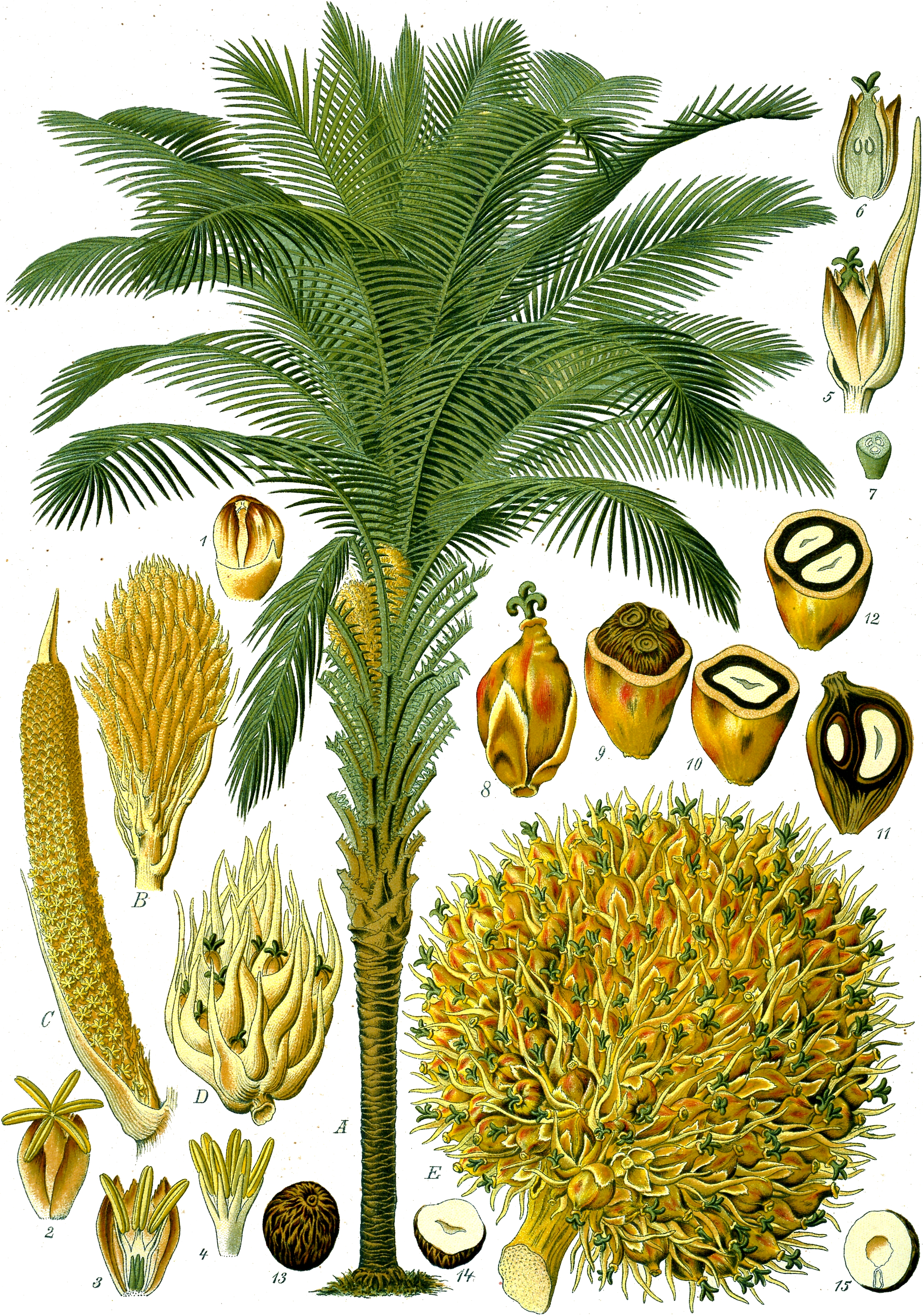
Elaeis Plant

Elaeidinae is a subtribe of plants in the family Arecaceae found in tropical South America and Africa. Genera in the subtribe are:

- Barcella – northern Brazil; monotypic genus
- Elaeis – Africa, northern South America

== See also ==
- List of Arecaceae genera
