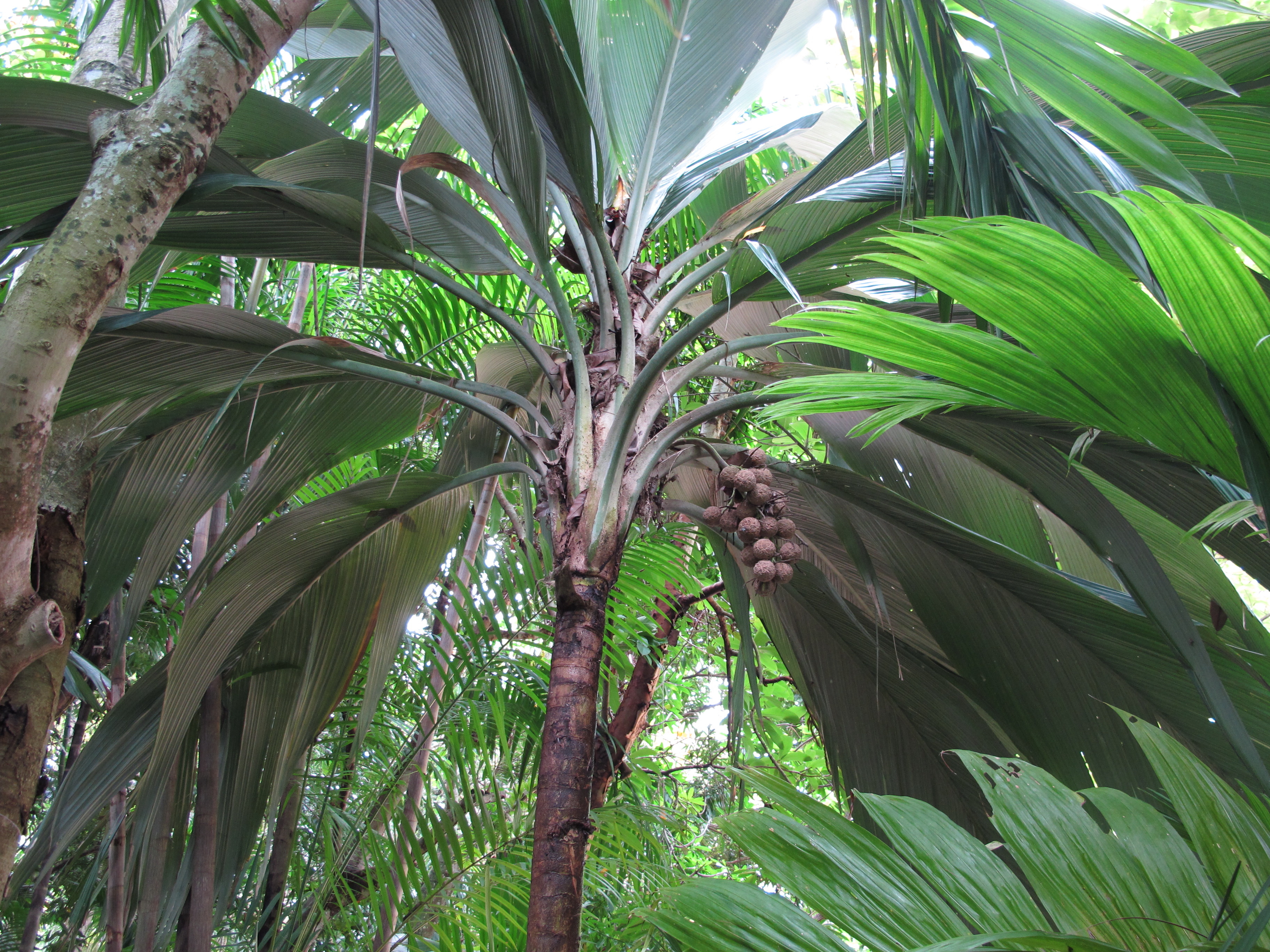

Conservation status
- Data Deficient (IUCN 3.1)

Scientific classification
- Kingdom: Plantae
- Clade: Tracheophytes
- Clade: Angiosperms
- Clade: Monocots
- Clade: Commelinids
- Order: Arecales
- Family: Arecaceae
- Subfamily: Arecoideae
- Tribe: Pelagodoxeae
- Genus: Pelagodoxa
- Species: P. henryana

Binomial name
- Pelagodoxa henryana Becc. (1917)

= Pelagodoxa henryana =

Species of palm tree

Pelagodoxa henryana is a species of palm tree. It is native to French Polynesia, where it survives on Nuku Hiva in the Marquesas Islands. A population on Raivavae in the Tubuai Islands is presumed extinct. The species is threatened by habitat loss.

== Description ==
Pelagodoxa henryana grows to 12 metres (39 ft) tall, with a smooth brown trunk up to 15 centimetres (5.9 in) in diameter marked by ring-like leaf scars. The crown consists of 15 to 20 large leaves, ascending to drooping. Leaves are up to 2.35 metres (7 ft 9 in) long and 1.5 metres (4 ft 11 in) wide, with a central rachis. Trees bear 12 to 15 inflorescences, each of which holds 15 to 30 mature fruits. Fruits are nearly spherical, 85–99 millimetres (3.3–3.9 in) in diameter. They are covered in a corky exocarp which splits into irregular pyramidal warts.

== Range and habitat ==
The plant was described by Odoardo Beccari in 1917, from seeds, notes, and photographs gathered on Fatu Hiva by Charles Henry in 1916, likely in the Taipivai Valley. The trees grow in disturbed lowland rain forest near the Teuakueenui waterfall. In 2012 a second population was discovered in the Hatihe'u valley. Both populations are from 140 to 300 metres (460 to 980 ft) elevation in lowland wet forest dominated by the trees Hibiscus tiliaceus, Inocarpus fagifer, and coconut (Cocos nucifera). Trees recorded in the 1920s at Unurau and Temahara on the island of Raivavae were gone by the 1980s. Both of the Fatu Hiva populations were discovered near old house sites, and the Raivavae populations were discovered at ritual marae sites, suggesting that these populations may have been established by humans.

== Conservation ==
Because of the small number and size of the remaining populations, and the vulnerability of its remaining habitat to human disturbance, the species is assessed as Critically Endangered. The tree is now cultivated in gardens on the high islands of French Polynesia, including the Marquesas, Society, and Gambier islands, and in Singapore, Hawaii, Australia, and elsewhere.
