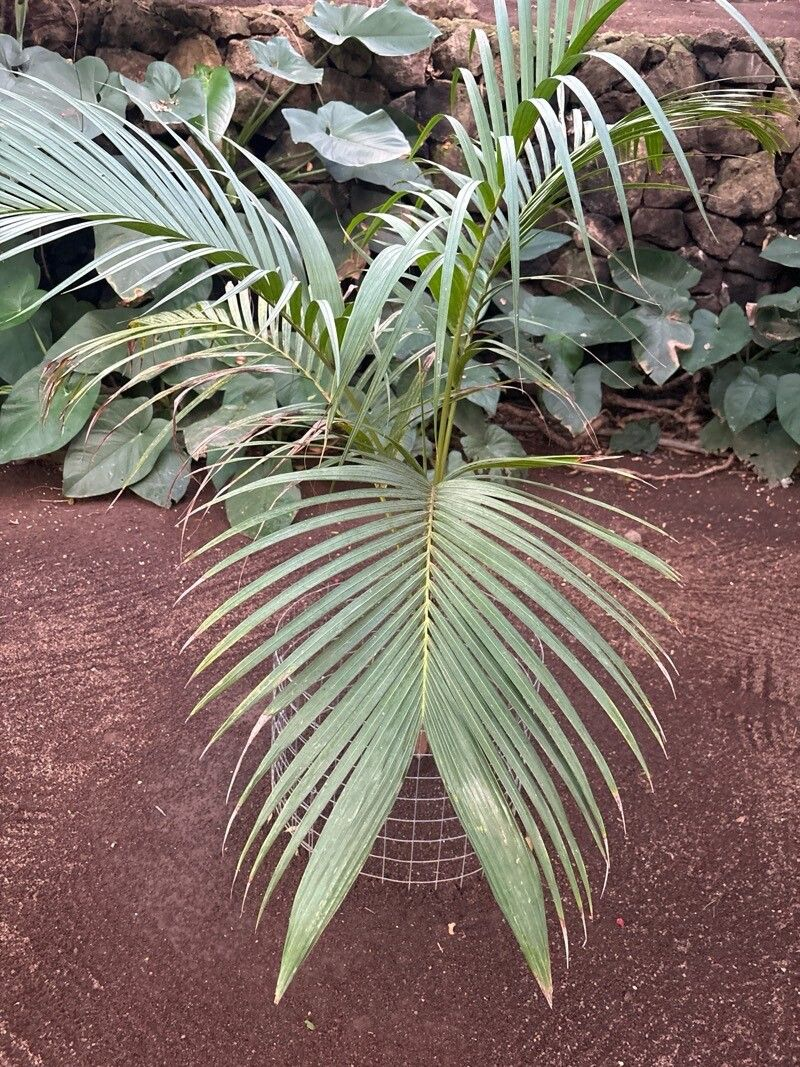

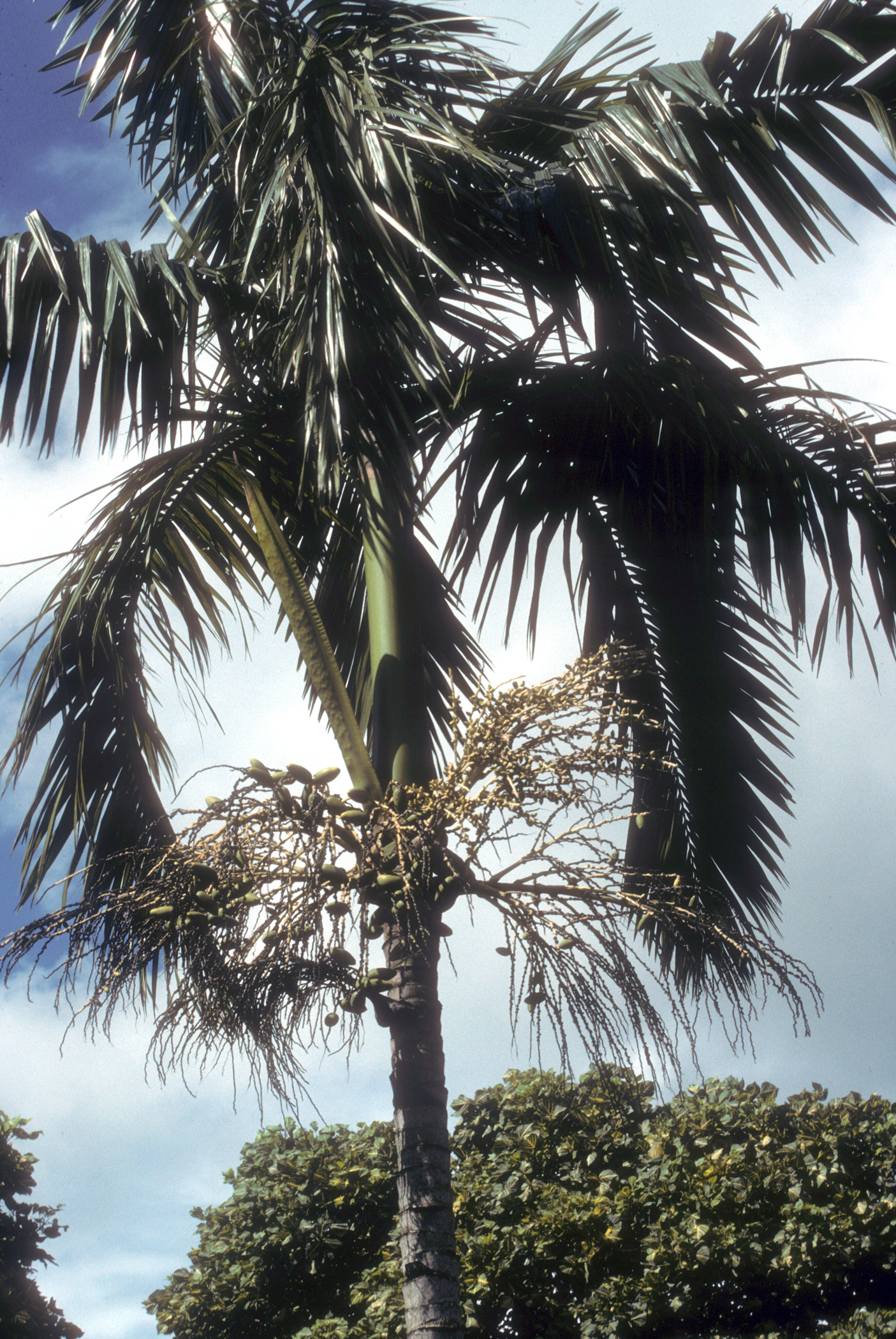

Scientific classification
- Kingdom: Plantae
- Clade: Tracheophytes
- Clade: Angiosperms
- Clade: Monocots
- Clade: Commelinids
- Order: Arecales
- Family: Arecaceae
- Subfamily: Arecoideae
- Tribe: Areceae
- Subtribe: Archontophoenicinae
- Genus: Actinorhytis; H. Wendl. & Drude
- Species: A. calapparia

Binomial name
- Actinorhytis calapparia (Blume) H. Wendl. & Drude ex Scheff.

Synonyms
- Areca calapparia Blume; Seaforthia calapparia (Blume) Mart.; Ptychosperma calapparia (Blume) Miq.; Areca cocoides Griff.; Actinorhytis poamau Becc.

= Actinorhytis =

Genus of palms

Actinorhytis is a monotypic genus of flowering plant in the palm family found in Oceania and southeast Asia. The lone species, Actinorhytis calapparia (commonly known as calappa palm) is a rain forest inhabitant and has very large fruit. The genus name is from two Greek words meaning 'ray' and 'fold' which describe the endosperm of the seed.

== Description ==
The species is solitary trunked, reaching 12–14 metres (39–46 ft) in height, and is relatively slender, usually no wider than 20 centimetres (8 in). At the base, the white to tan trunks are anchored by a large, conical mass of aerial roots and are topped by a distinct 1-metre (3 ft) crownshaft, slightly bulging at the base. The leaf crown is sparse but spherical, each arching leaf is around 3 m (10 ft) long with pinnately arranged 45-centimetre (18 in) leaflets which are dark green in colour. The leaflets are closely and regularly arranged along the rachis and the abaxially rounded petiole is usually long in youth but shorter in maturity.

The much branched monoecious inflorescence forms below the leaf bases, ringing the trunk with cream-coloured male and female flowers. Both sexes carry three sepals and three petals and in both cases the sepals are two or three times longer than the petals. The inflorescence becomes pendent as the large fruit set; the beaked, ovoid fruit are red to purple to green; each fruit contains one seed.

== Distribution and habitat ==
Actinorhytis calapparia is native to New Guinea and the Solomon Islands thriving in lowland rain forest from sea level to 1,000 m (3,300 ft). While understory subjects for much of their life, they eventually reach the top of the forest canopy. The species is also reportedly naturalised in Thailand, Sumatra, and peninsular Malaysia.

== Cultivation and uses ==
Actinorhytis calapparia is widely cultivated in Southeast Asia and Malesia where villagers attribute it magical or medicinal powers, or as a substitute to betel. They have little tolerance for drought, requiring generous water as well as nutrient rich soil; they do, however, exhibit some tolerance to cold.
