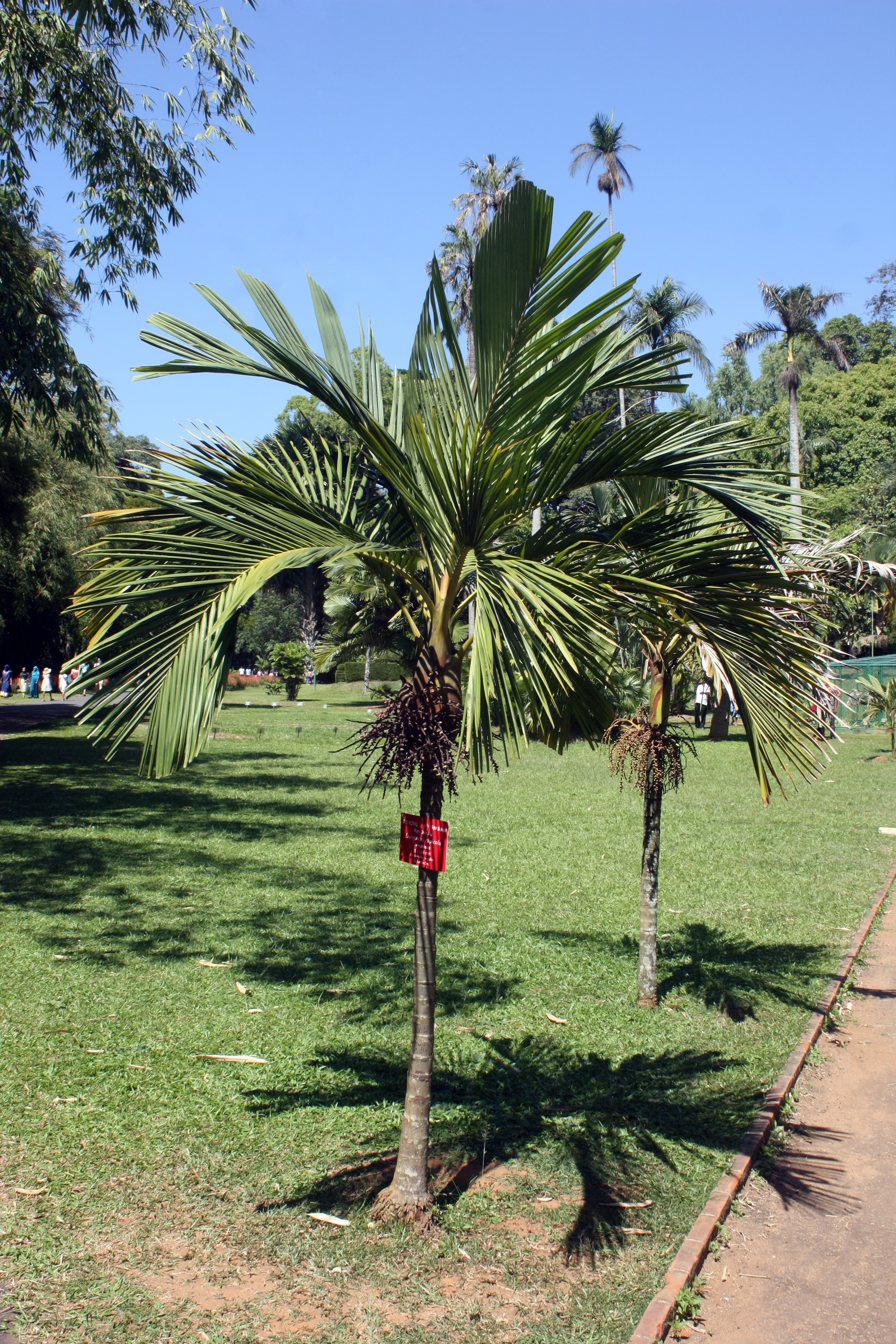

Conservation status
- Critically Endangered (IUCN 2.3)

Scientific classification
- Kingdom: Plantae
- Clade: Tracheophytes
- Clade: Angiosperms
- Clade: Monocots
- Clade: Commelinids
- Order: Arecales
- Family: Arecaceae
- Subfamily: Arecoideae
- Tribe: Areceae
- Genus: Loxococcus; H.Wendl.
- Species: L. rupicola

Binomial name
- Loxococcus rupicola H.Wendl. & Drude

= Loxococcus =

Genus of palms

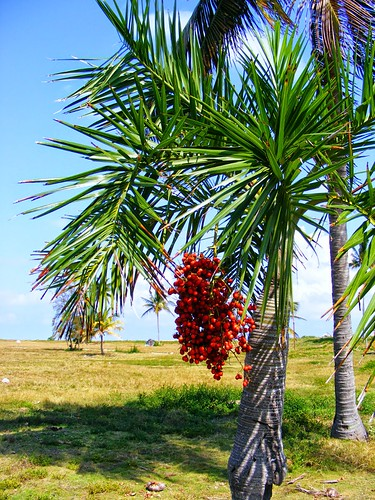
Loxococcus rupicola (Dothalu/Lenthiri)

Loxococcus rupicola is a species of palm tree, and the only species in the genus Loxococcus. It is endemic to Sri Lanka. It is threatened by habitat loss.
