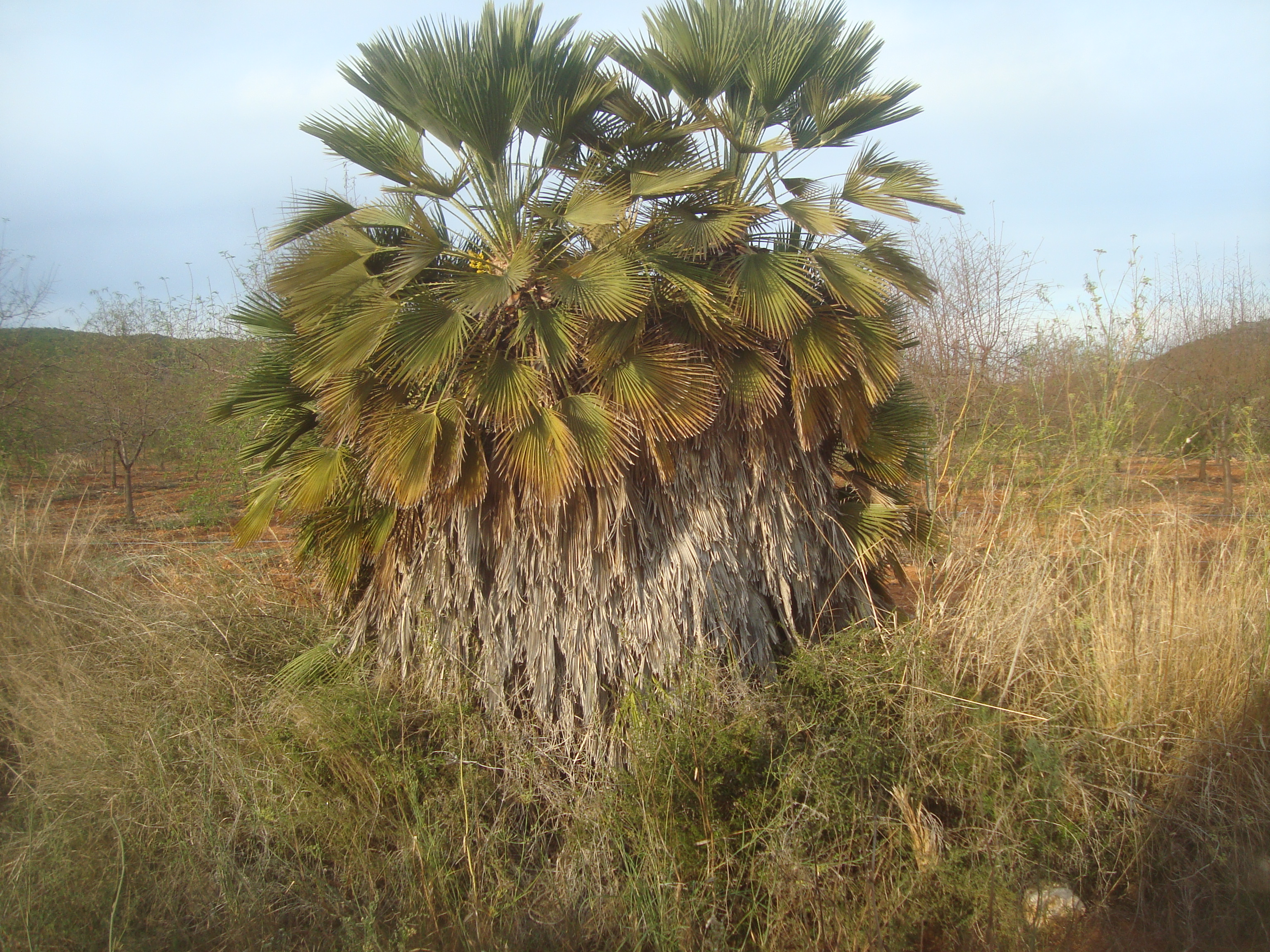
- Chamaerops humilis

Scientific classification
- Kingdom: Plantae
- Clade: Tracheophytes
- Clade: Angiosperms
- Clade: Monocots
- Clade: Commelinids
- Order: Arecales
- Family: Arecaceae
- Subfamily: Coryphoideae
- Tribe: Trachycarpeae
- Subtribe: Rhapidinae

= Rhapidinae =

Tribe of palms

Rhapidinae is a subtribe of plants in the family Arecaceae found in Southeast Asia and the Mediterranean. Genera in the subtribe are:

- Chamaerops – Mediterranean
- Guihaia – Vietnam and China
- Trachycarpus – southern China, northern Indochina, Himalayas

== See also ==
- List of Arecaceae genera
