= Wallaceodoxa =

Scientific classification
- Kingdom: Plantae
- Clade: Tracheophytes
- Clade: Angiosperms
- Clade: Monocots
- Clade: Commelinids
- Order: Arecales
- Family: Arecaceae
- Tribe: Areceae
- Subtribe: Ptychospermatinae
- Genus: Wallaceodoxa; Heatubun & W.J.Baker
- Species: W. raja-ampat

Binomial name
- Wallaceodoxa raja-ampat Heatubun & W.J.Baker

Genus of plants in the palm family

Wallaceodoxa is a genus of palm (family Arecaceae), in the subtribe Ptychospermatinae. It has only one currently [when?] accepted species, Wallaceodoxa raja-ampat, native to the Raja Ampat Islands off the Bird's Head Peninsula of New Guinea. It grows on limestone soils.
