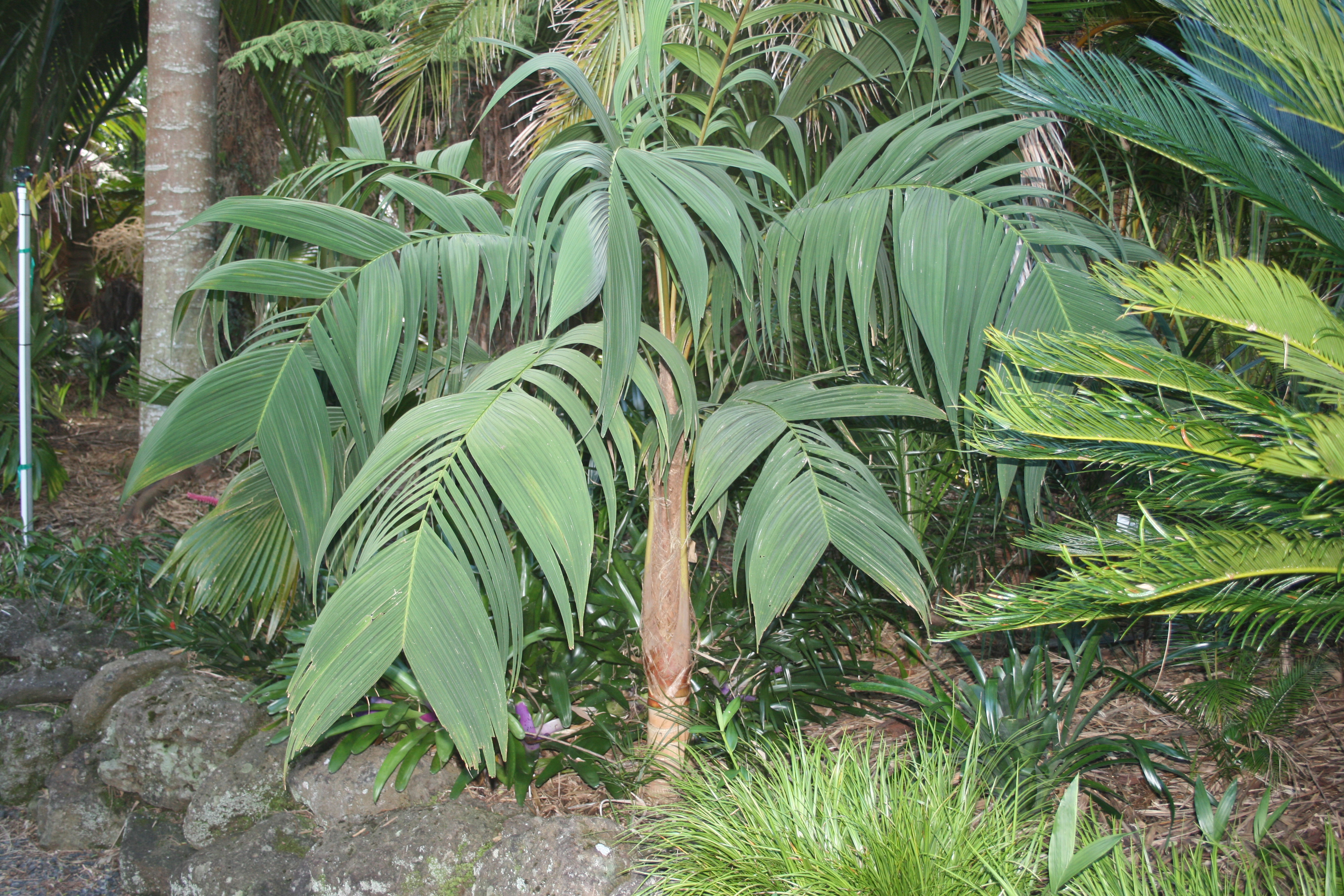
- Young Geonoma undata

Scientific classification
- Kingdom: Plantae
- Clade: Tracheophytes
- Clade: Angiosperms
- Clade: Monocots
- Clade: Commelinids
- Order: Arecales
- Family: Arecaceae
- Subfamily: Arecoideae
- Tribe: Geonomateae

Genera
- Asterogyne; Calyptrogyne; Calyptronoma; Geonoma; Pholidostachys; Welfia

Synonyms
- Geonomeae

= Geonomateae =

Tribe of palms

Geonomateae (also Geonomeae) is a palm tribe in the subfamily Arecoideae. It is an important Neotropical group due to its wide distribution across Central and South America, its diversity and abundance, and the use of a number of species by local human populations. The distribution of the tribe stretches from southeast Mexico down through Central America and into South America, notably Brazil and Bolivia, and species are also found in the Greater and Lesser Antilles. This tribe consists of a group of understory and sub-canopy palms that populate both tropical lowland and montane forests. While members of this group are relatively easy to collect, as they are not canopy palms or spiny palms, and are well represented in herbaria, the taxonomy and phylogeny of the species within the tribe are still uncertain. The resolution of the tribe has been disputed despite the fact that tribe's species are characterized by three morphological synapomorphies: the petals of pistillate flowers are basally connate, the presence of slender and elongate styles, and the flowers are borne in pits in the rachillae.

== Genera ==
Genera in the tribe are:

- Welfia – Central America, Colombia, Ecuador
- Pholidostachys – NW South America, Panama, Costa Rica
- Calyptrogyne – Central America
- Calyptronoma – Greater Antilles
- Asterogyne – northern South America, Central America
- Geonoma – Americas

== See also ==
- List of Arecaceae genera
