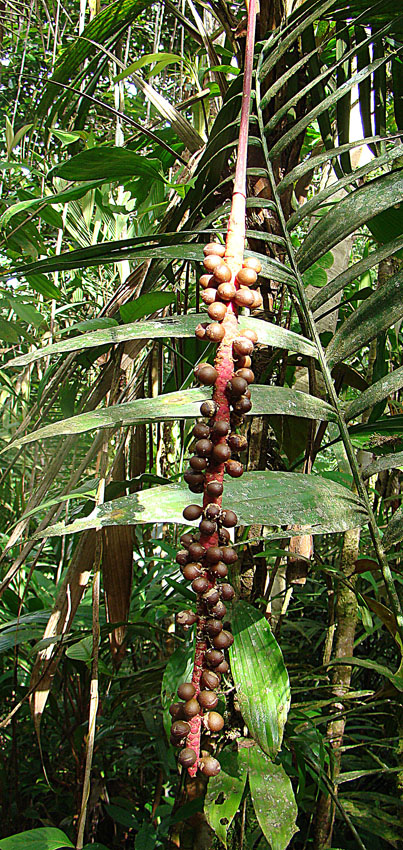
- Pholidostachys dactyloides

Scientific classification
- Kingdom: Plantae
- Clade: Tracheophytes
- Clade: Angiosperms
- Clade: Monocots
- Clade: Commelinids
- Order: Arecales
- Family: Arecaceae
- Subfamily: Arecoideae
- Tribe: Geonomateae
- Genus: Pholidostachys; H.Wendl. ex Benth. & Hook.f.

Type species
- Pholidostachys pulchra H.Wendl. ex Burret

= Pholidostachys =

Genus of palms

Pholidostachys is a genus of palms found in Central America and northwestern South America (northwestern Brazil, Colombia, Ecuador, Peru).

== Species ==
- Pholidostachys amazonensis A.J.Hend. - Peru
- Pholidostachys dactyloides H.E.Moore. - Panama, Colombia, Ecuador
- Pholidostachys kalbreyeri H.Wendl. ex Burret - Panama, Colombia
- Pholidostachys occidentalis A.J.Hend. - Ecuador
- Pholidostachys panamensis A.J.Hend. - Panama
- Pholidostachys pulchra H.Wendl. ex Burret - Costa Rica, Nicaragua, Panama, Colombia
- Pholidostachys sanluisensis A.J.Hend. - Colombia
- Pholidostachys synanthera (Mart.) H.E.Moore - Colombia, Ecuador, Peru, Amazonas State of Brazil
