= Cyrtostachydinae =

Scientific classification
- Kingdom: Plantae
- Clade: Tracheophytes
- Clade: Angiosperms
- Clade: Monocots
- Clade: Commelinids
- Order: Arecales
- Family: Arecaceae
- Tribe: Areceae
- Subtribe: Cyrtostachydinae; Mart. ex Dumort.

Genera
- Cyrtostachys

Subtribe of palms

Cyrtostachydinae is a palm tree subtribe in the tribe Areceae.
