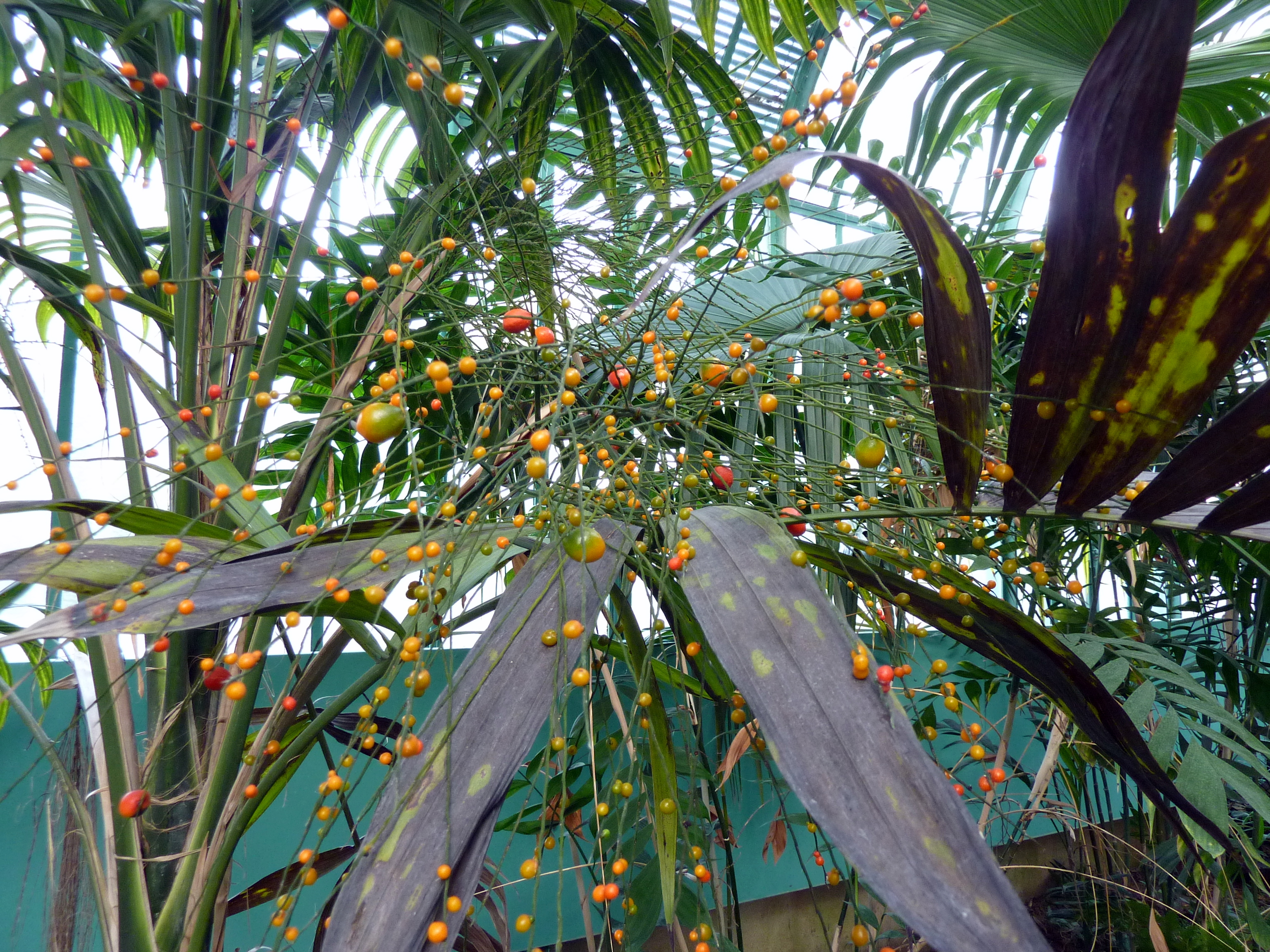
- Synechanthus fibrosus

Scientific classification
- Kingdom: Plantae
- Clade: Tracheophytes
- Clade: Angiosperms
- Clade: Monocots
- Clade: Commelinids
- Order: Arecales
- Family: Arecaceae
- Subfamily: Arecoideae
- Tribe: Chamaedoreeae; Drude

Genera
- Chamaedorea; Gaussia; Hyophorbe; Synechanthus; Wendlandiella

Synonyms
- Hyophorbeae Luerss.

= Chamaedoreeae =

Tribe of palms

Chamaedoreeae is a palm tribe in the subfamily Arecoideae. It has five genera.

== Genera ==
- Hyophorbe – Mascarenes
- Wendlandiella – Peruvian Amazon
- Synechanthus – Central America, Colombia, Ecuador
- Chamaedorea – Central America, NW South America
- Gaussia – Mexico, Belize, Cuba

== See also ==
- List of Arecaceae genera
