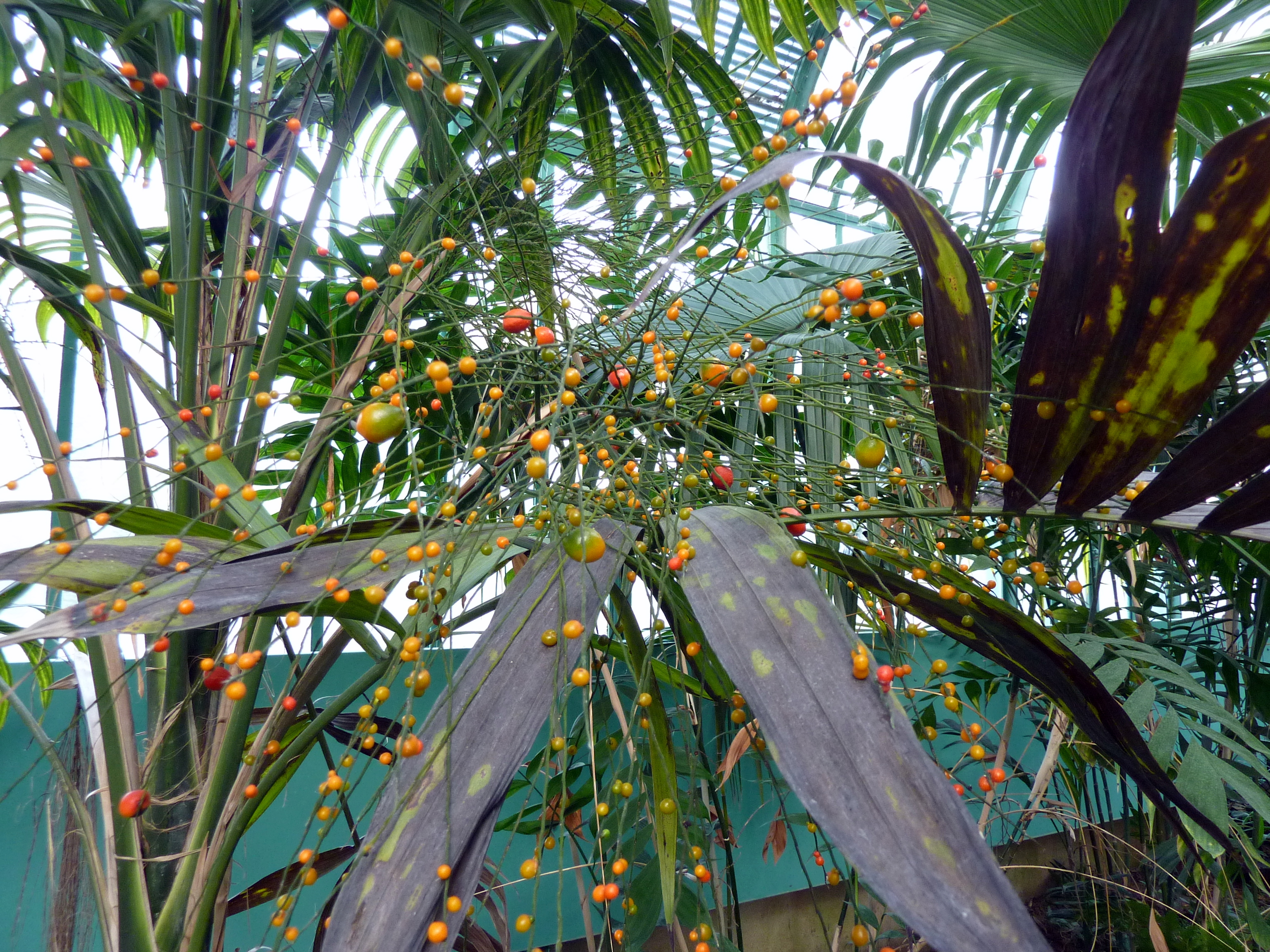
- Synechanthus fibrosus

Scientific classification
- Kingdom: Plantae
- Clade: Tracheophytes
- Clade: Angiosperms
- Clade: Monocots
- Clade: Commelinids
- Order: Arecales
- Family: Arecaceae
- Subfamily: Arecoideae
- Tribe: Chamaedoreeae
- Genus: Synechanthus; H. Wendl.

Species
- Synechanthus fibrosus; Synechanthus warscewiczianus

= Synechanthus =

Genus of palms

Synechanthus is a monoecious genus of flowering plant in the palm family found in Mexico, Central and South America. Commonly called bola, palmilla, or jelly bean palm, they are closely related to members of Chamaedorea, only distinguished by their flower and fruit form. The Greek genus name is a combination of "united" and "flower".

== Description ==
Synechanthus fibrosus is solitary while S. warscewiczianus is clustering. The trunks of both are slender, rarely more than 2.5 cm wide, growing to 4.5 m tall; usually dark green, they are ringed by white leaf scars. S. warscewiczianus will usually have a dominant main stem with smaller clustering units surrounding it. The pinnate leaf is over a meter long, borne on a 30 cm petiole; the rachis is angled above and rounded below, the leaflets are slightly offset, occasionally twisting, the apical set being widest.

The inflorescence emerges in the leaf crown but sags pendent in fruit, once or twice branched and solitary. The peduncle is long and the prophyll short and tubular, disintegrating into a fibrous mass at the base. There are four to five peduncular bracts, longer than the prophyll, with the distalmost exceeding the peduncle. The rachis is elongated bearing slender rachillae with slender, spinelike tips. The flowers are arranged on the rachillae such that the pistillate members are proximal, with 5 - 13 staminate flowers at the distal end.

The staminate flowers mature from green to yellow, triangular in bud, with three sepals fused into a lobed cupule and three valvate petals. They carry three or six stamens on short, recurved filaments with basifixed, latrose anthers with elliptic, monosulcate pollen and scabrate, tectate exine. The pistillode, when present, is small, ovoid and three lobed. The pistillate flowers are also yellow with three cupped sepals and three longer, imbricate petals. When staminodes are present there are three, joined in a ring; the gynoecum is ovoid, triocular and triovulate. The three stigmas are recurved with elongated, laterally attached ovules. The large fruit is round or slightly egg shaped, maturing to bright red or orange in color, with a fleshy mesocarp and a membranous endocarp. The single seed has homogeneous endosperm and a centrally placed embryo.

== Distribution and habitat ==
Synthechanthus palms are found in Mexico, Guatemala, Honduras, Nicaragua, Costa Rica, Panama, Colombia and Ecuador. They are rain forest inhabitants, usually confined to the understory, from sea level to 1200 m.

== Cultivation ==
Both are cultivated as ornamentals, requiring rain forest-like conditions to thrive, shade or filtered light, humus-rich, friable soil and copious amounts of quickly-draining water; neither is hardy to cold, requiring protection from freezing temperatures.
