= Jailoloa =

Scientific classification
- Kingdom: Plantae
- Clade: Tracheophytes
- Clade: Angiosperms
- Clade: Monocots
- Clade: Commelinids
- Order: Arecales
- Family: Arecaceae
- Tribe: Areceae
- Subtribe: Ptychospermatinae
- Genus: Jailoloa; Heatubun & W.J.Baker
- Species: J. halmaherensis

Binomial name
- Jailoloa halmaherensis (Heatubun) Heatubun & W.J.Baker

Synonyms
- Ptychosperma halmaherense Heatubun

Genus of plants in the palm family

Jailoloa is a genus of palm (family Arecaceae), in the subtribe Ptychospermatinae. It has only one currently accepted species, Jailoloa halmaherensis, native to the Moluccas. It only grows on ultramafic soils. The species is currently known only from its type locality in East Halmahera.
