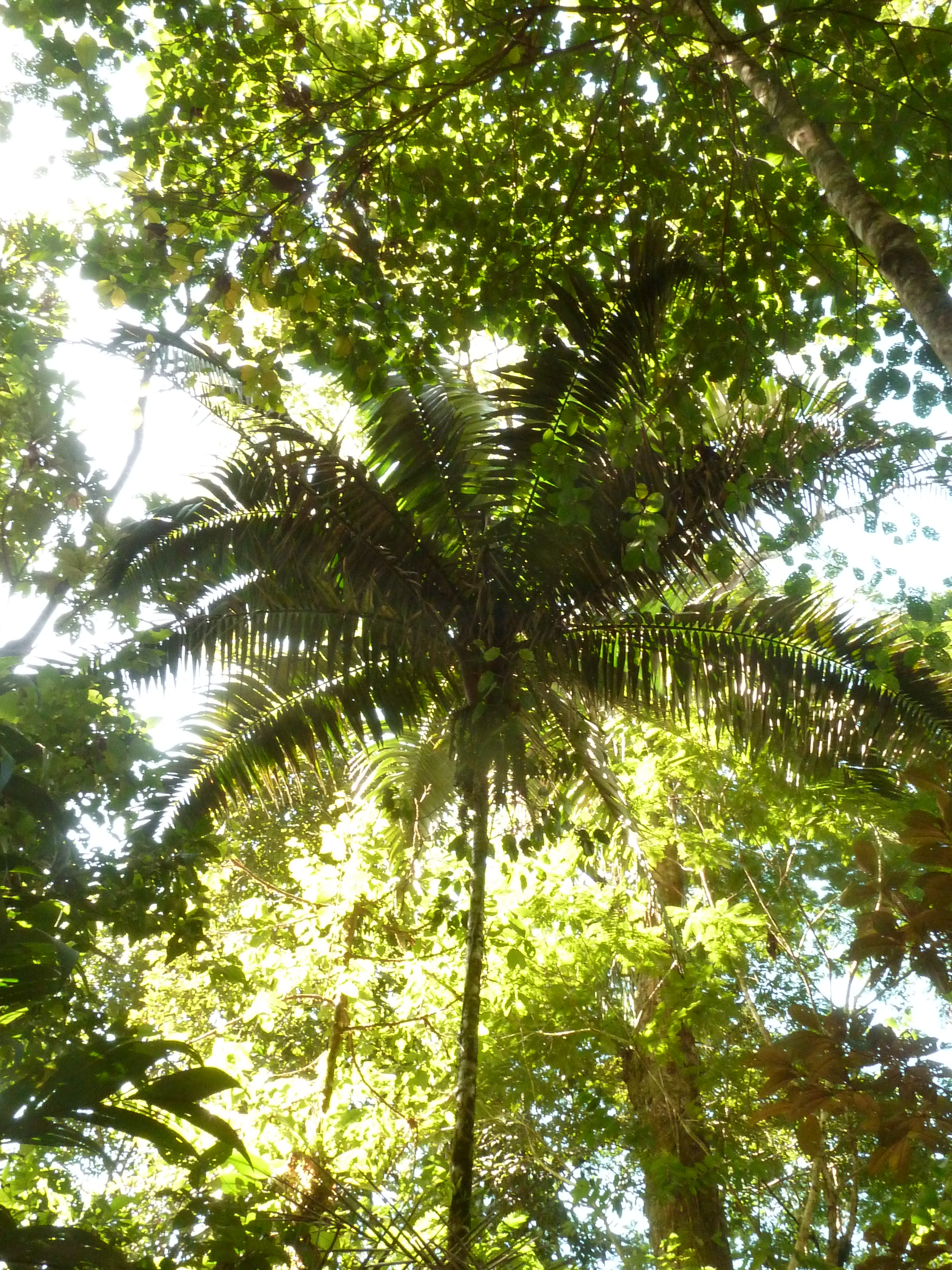
- Welfia regia

Scientific classification
- Kingdom: Plantae
- Clade: Tracheophytes
- Clade: Angiosperms
- Clade: Monocots
- Clade: Commelinids
- Order: Arecales
- Family: Arecaceae
- Subfamily: Arecoideae
- Tribe: Geonomateae
- Genus: Welfia; H. Wendl.

Species
- Welfia alfredii; Welfia regia

= Welfia =

Genus of palms

Welfia is a genus of palms found in Central America (Panama, Costa Rica, Honduras, Nicaragua) and northwestern South America (Colombia, Ecuador, Peru). Only two species are currently recognized: Welfia regia and Welfia alfredii.
