= Hyospathe macrorhachis =

Conservation status
- Near Threatened (IUCN 3.1)

Scientific classification
- Kingdom: Plantae
- Clade: Tracheophytes
- Clade: Angiosperms
- Clade: Monocots
- Clade: Commelinids
- Order: Arecales
- Family: Arecaceae
- Genus: Hyospathe
- Species: H. macrorhachis

Binomial name
- Hyospathe macrorhachis Burret

Species of palm

Hyospathe macrorhachis is a species of flowering plant in the family Arecaceae. It is found only in Ecuador. Its natural habitats are subtropical or tropical moist lowland forests and subtropical or tropical moist montane forests. It is threatened by habitat loss.
