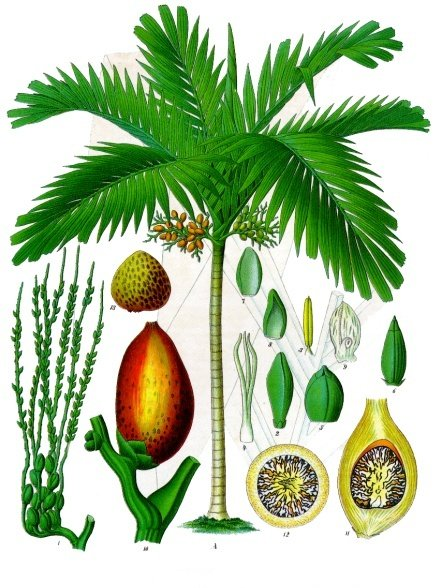
- Areca catechu

Scientific classification
- Kingdom: Plantae
- Clade: Tracheophytes
- Clade: Angiosperms
- Clade: Monocots
- Clade: Commelinids
- Order: Arecales
- Family: Arecaceae
- Subfamily: Arecoideae
- Tribe: Areceae; Mart. ex Dumort.

Subtribes
- Archontophoenicinae - Arecinae - Cyrtostachydinae - Dypsidinae - Euterpeinae - Iguanurinae - Lemurophoenicinae - Leopoldiniinae - Linospadicinae - Malortieinae - Manicariinae - Masoalinae - Oncospermatinae - Oraniinae - Ptychospermatinae - Roystoneinae - Sclerospermatinae

= Areceae =

Tribe of palms

Areceae is a palm tree tribe in the family Arecaceae.

Subtribes:

- Archontophoenicinae
- Arecinae
- Basseliniinae
- Carpoxylinae
- Clinospermatinae
- Dypsidinae
- Laccospadicinae
- Oncospermatinae
- Ptychospermatinae
- Rhopalostylidinae
- Verschaffeltiinae

Genera not assigned to subtribes:

- Bentinckia
- Clinostigma
- Cyrtostachys
- Dictyosperma
- Dransfieldia
- Heterospathe
- Hydriastele
- Iguanura
- Loxococcus
- Rhopaloblaste

== See also ==
- List of Arecaceae genera
