= Sclerosperma =

Scientific classification
- Kingdom: Plantae
- Clade: Tracheophytes
- Clade: Angiosperms
- Clade: Monocots
- Clade: Commelinids
- Order: Arecales
- Family: Arecaceae
- Subfamily: Arecoideae
- Tribe: Sclerospermeae
- Genus: Sclerosperma; G. Mann & H. Wendl.

Species
- Sclerosperma mannii; Sclerosperma profizianum; Sclerosperma walkeri

Genus of palms

Sclerosperma is a monoecious genus of flowering plant in the palm family found in Africa where three species are known. Having no obvious relatives, it does resemble the Madagascar native Marojejya though a detailed study of Madagascar's palms is required to determine if any true relationship exists. The lack of relatives, and its interesting qualities, indicate, at one time, the existence of a diverse African palm flora. The name is from two Greek words meaning "hard" and "seed".

== Description ==
The trunks are barely emergent or not at all, clustering, when above ground they are ringed with close leaf scars. The leaves are very big, reduplicate, either divided or bifid, with a short sheath and a long slender petiole. Those with divided leaves have many narrow folds, each featuring a prominent midrib. The margins have tiny teeth, the undersides glaucous, the tops dark green, with small scales along the veins.

The inflorescence spike emerges within the leaf crown, often concealed, and the peduncle is short and tomentose. The prophyll is two keeled, short and fibrous, the peduncular bract is longer, tubular, and forms a hairy net around the flowers with two bracts borne below each. The rachis is short and stout with triads at the base and rows of pistillate units towards the end.

The staminate flowers have three elongated, tapering sepals and three thick, valvate petals. There may be up to 60 stamens with short filaments with basifixed, elongated anthers. The exine is tectate and reticulate; pistillodes are not present. The pistillate flowers are longer and ovoid with three sepals forming a cup, and three imbricate petals with thick, valvate tips. There are six tiny staminodes with ovoid, uniovulate gynoecium matted in thin brown scales and bearing a three-angled stigma; the ovule is ± pendulous.

The fruit is spherical, indented, becoming purple or black when ripe. The mesocarp is thin, the endocarp is hard and bony enclosing a single, round seed.

== Distribution and habitat ==
From Equatorial Guinea, Cameroon, and Nigeria these palms usually grow in wet, low land, tropical forest, often in swamps. They may creep up hill slopes or into sandy, friable loam, which becomes periodically flooded. In habitat the leaves are used in thatch and the seeds eaten.
