= Dransfieldia =

Scientific classification
- Kingdom: Plantae
- Clade: Tracheophytes
- Clade: Angiosperms
- Clade: Monocots
- Clade: Commelinids
- Order: Arecales
- Family: Arecaceae
- Subfamily: Arecoideae
- Tribe: Areceae
- Genus: Dransfieldia; W.J. Baker & Zona
- Species: D. micrantha

Binomial name
- Dransfieldia micrantha (Becc.) W.J.Baker & Zona

Synonyms
- Ptychosperma micranthum Becc.; Rhopaloblaste micrantha (Becc.) Hook.f. ex B.D.Jacks.; Heterospathe micrantha (Becc.) H.E.Moore

Genus of palms

Dransfieldia is a monotypic genus of flowering plant in the palm family from western New Guinea where the lone species Dransfieldia micrantha grows in dense rain forest. Discovered in 1872, 134 years passed before DNA testing revealed its proper placement. With no close relatives, it is a delicate, pinnate-leaved palm named after John Dransfield, former palm expert at the Kew Royal Botanic Gardens.

== Description ==
The thin trunk is solitary, gray to maroon in color, with distinct, widely spaced leaf scar rings. The leaf sheaths are extended, forming a distinct green crownshaft; the small rachis bears widely spaced, acute leaflets, slightly offset and taper to a point. The inflorescence is borne beneath the crownshaft, protected by a caducous prohyll, once-branched, producing one-seeded fruit with apical remains.

== Taxonomy ==
Odoardo Beccari first collected the palm in Indonesian New Guinea in 1872 assigning it to the genus Ptychosperma under the epithet micranthum, Latin for "small flower". The leaf tips were not jagged like most in the genus and, eleven years later, was moved to Rhopaloblaste by Sir Joseph Hooker, then director of the Kew gardens. The fit was imperfect as the male flowers and seedling eophylls in Rhopaloblaste did not match. In 1970, palm scientist Harold E. Moore analyzed Beccari's collection, and despite bearing a crownshaft, reclassified it as a member of Heterospathe, a non-crownshafted genus. Finally, in 2006, DNA tests revealed the plant matched no known genera; it was named for John Dransfield by his contemporaries to honor his long study of the family.

== Distribution and habitat ==
They are restricted to western New Guinea rain forest undergrowth, with high humidity and frequent rainfall.
