= Podococcus =

Scientific classification
- Kingdom: Plantae
- Clade: Tracheophytes
- Clade: Angiosperms
- Clade: Monocots
- Clade: Commelinids
- Order: Arecales
- Family: Arecaceae
- Subfamily: Arecoideae
- Tribe: Podococceae
- Genus: Podococcus; G. Mann & H. Wendl.

Genus of palms

Podococcus is a genus of palms found in tropical Africa. It includes two recognized species:

- Podococcus acaulis Hua - Gabon, Congo-Brazzaville
- Podococcus barteri G. Mann & H. Wendl. - Gabon, Congo-Brazzaville, Nigeria, Cameroon, Equatorial Guinea, Cabinda, Zaire
