= Lanonia =

Scientific classification
- Kingdom: Plantae
- Clade: Tracheophytes
- Clade: Angiosperms
- Clade: Monocots
- Clade: Commelinids
- Order: Arecales
- Family: Arecaceae
- Subfamily: Coryphoideae
- Tribe: Trachycarpeae
- Genus: Lanonia; AJ Hend. & CD Bacon, 2011

Genus of palms

Lanonia is a genus of fan palms, in the tribe Trachycarpeae (subtribe: Livistoninae). It has a recorded native range from southern China to Indo-China and is also found in Java.

== Description and phylogeny ==
Lanonia spp. are fan palms: originally eight species, six endemic to Vietnam, were transferred here from the similar genus Licuala, but which was found not to be monophyletic; if anything Lanonia is more closely related to Johannesteijsmannia. In this phylogenetic study, seven gene regions were analysed, significantly resolving the relationships of genera in the subtribe Livistoninae.

These palms are dioecious, although not exclusively in cultivated specimens: in contrast to Licuala spp., which possess hermaphroditic flowers. The staminate and pistillate inflorescences are dimorphic in size, shape, and branching. The leaves of Lanonia may best be distinguished by the petioles, which appear to taper into the blades of each leaf. As with other fan palms, this leaf structure lends itself to the production of Vietnamese conical hats, for which the genus is named.

== Species ==
Plants of the World Online currently (February 2021) includes 13 accepted species:

- Lanonia acaulis (A.J.Hend., N.K.Ban & N.Q.Dung) A.J.Hend. & C.D.Bacon
- Lanonia batoensis A.J.Hend. & N.Q.Dung
- Lanonia calciphila (Becc.) A.J.Hend. & C.D.Bacon
- Lanonia centralis (A.J.Hend., N.K.Ban & N.Q.Dung) A.J.Hend. & C.D.Bacon
- Lanonia dasyantha (Burret) A.J.Hend. & C.D.Bacon
- Lanonia eclipsata
- Lanonia gialaiensis A.J.Hend. & N.Q.Dung
- Lanonia gracilis (Blume) A.J.Hend. & C.D.Bacon
- Lanonia hainanensis (A.J.Hend., L.X.Guo & Barfod) A.J.Hend. & C.D.Bacon
- Lanonia hexasepala (Gagnep.) A.J.Hend. & C.D.Bacon
- Lanonia magalonii (A.J.Hend., N.K.Ban & N.Q.Dung) A.J.Hend. & C.D.Bacon
- Lanonia manglaensis (A.J.Hend., N.K.Ban & N.Q.Dung) A.J.Hend. & N.Q.Dung
- Lanonia poilanei A.J.Hend. & N.Q.Dung
- Lanonia verrucosa A.J.Hend. & N.Q.Dung
