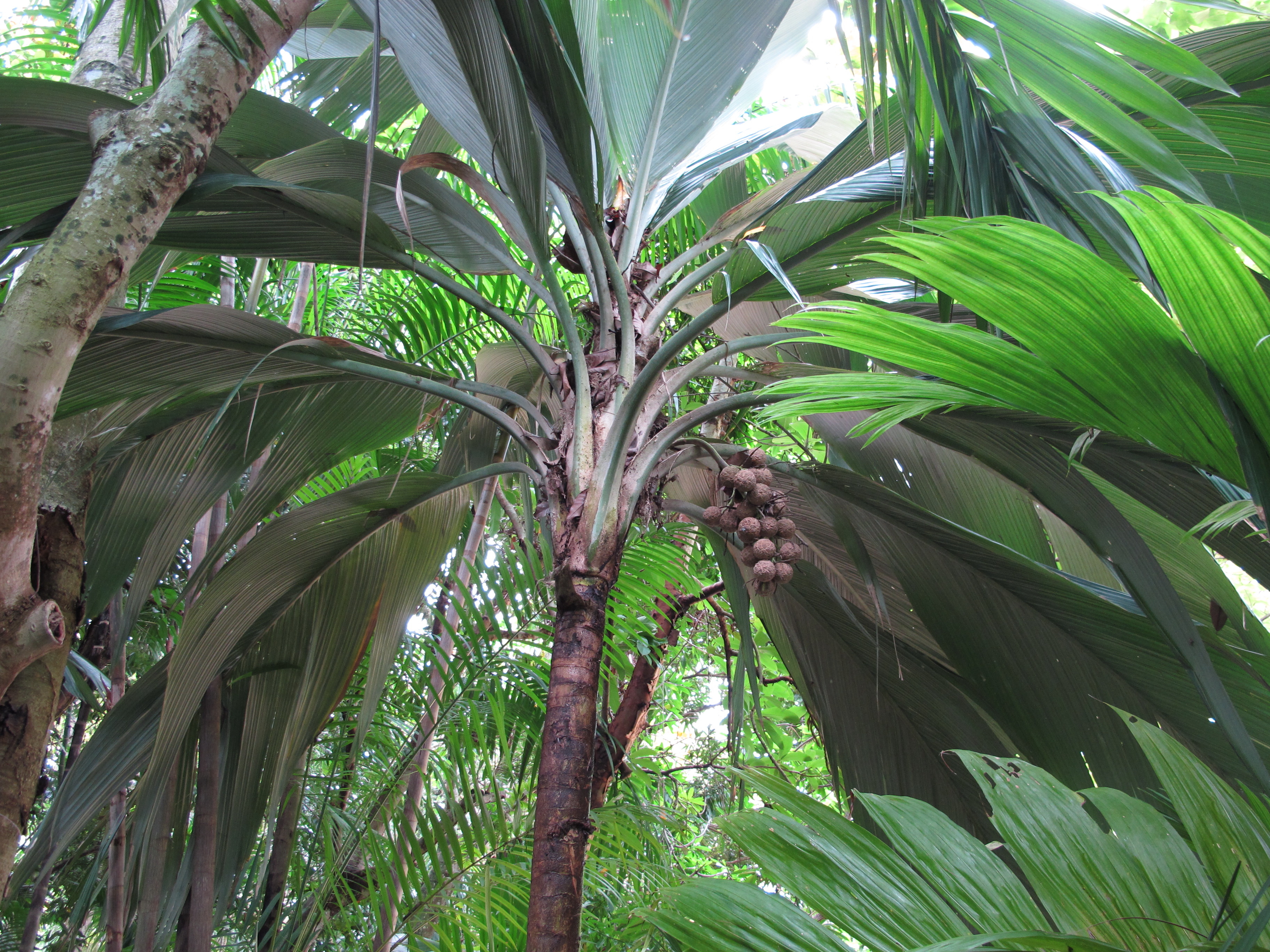
- pelagodoxa henryana

Scientific classification
- Kingdom: Plantae
- Clade: Tracheophytes
- Clade: Angiosperms
- Clade: Monocots
- Clade: Commelinids
- Order: Arecales
- Family: Arecaceae
- Subfamily: Arecoideae
- Tribe: Pelagodoxeae

= Pelagodoxeae =

Tribe of palms

Pelagodoxeae is a tribe of plants in the family Arecaceae found in Oceania, namely in New Guinea and the Marquesas Islands. The tribe has two monotypic genera, which are:

- Pelagodoxa – Marquesas Islands
- Sommieria – NW New Guinea

== See also ==
- List of Arecaceae genera
