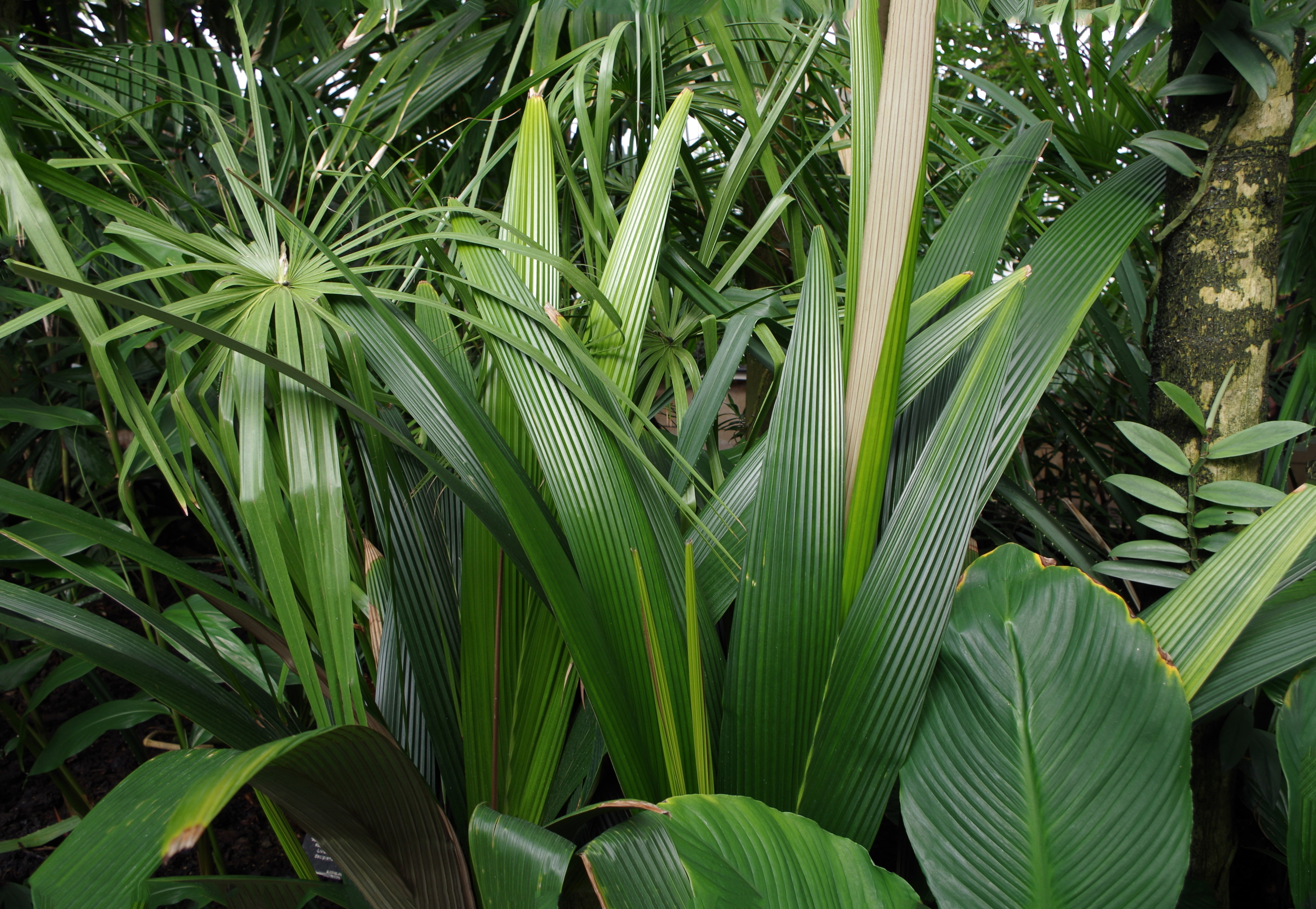
- Sommieria leucophylla - Kew Gardens

Scientific classification
- Kingdom: Plantae
- Clade: Tracheophytes
- Clade: Angiosperms
- Clade: Monocots
- Clade: Commelinids
- Order: Arecales
- Family: Arecaceae
- Subfamily: Arecoideae
- Tribe: Pelagodoxeae
- Genus: Sommieria; Becc.
- Species: S. leucophylla

Binomial name
- Sommieria leucophylla Becc.

= Sommieria =

Genus of palms

Sommieria is a monotypic genus of flowering plant in the palm family endemic to New Guinea (Papua New Guinea and West Papua in Indonesia) where they grow in rain forest understory. The sole species is Sommieria leucophylla. They resemble the Asterogyne palms but are most closely related to those members of Heterospathe with short stems and sparsely branched inlforescences. The name honors Stephen Sommier, European botanist.

== Description ==
A solitary plant, the trunk may or may not emerge above ground level and lacks armament. The short petiole and numerous leaves give it a full crown, each leaf is undivided, irregularly divided, or deeply bifid, with densely tomentose sheaths which disintegrate into a mass of fibers at the base. The inflorescence is interfoliar and erect, about as long as the leaves and branched to one order. The peduncle is long and slender, the single peduncular bract is tubular and borne at the tip of the peduncle, enclosing the flowers before antithesis. The short rachis usually bears few rachillae, spirally arranged, each subtended by a small bract.

The staminate flowers are asymmetrical and borne in triads with three distinct, valvate sepals and three thick petals. There are around 60 stamens with very short filaments, the elongated, basifixed anthers carry triangle shaped pollen with reticulate, tectate exine. The pistillate flowers become larger than the male's, the three sepals have rounded sides and pointed tips and the petals are asymmetrical with thick valvate tips. There are three to six small, triangular staminodes and the gynoecium is ovoid and covered in brown scales. The three stigmas are apical and reflexed; the ovule is pendulous. The red epicarp of the small round fruit breaks away in age exposing the brown, warty mesocarp. The single seed is spherical with homogeneous endosperm and a subbasal embryo.

== Distribution and habitat ==
It is found in Western New Guinea and Papua New Guinea where it is restricted to dense rain forest understory. There they grow in constant shade or filtered light with high humidity and regular rainfall. They are not commonly cultivated and have no known uses.
