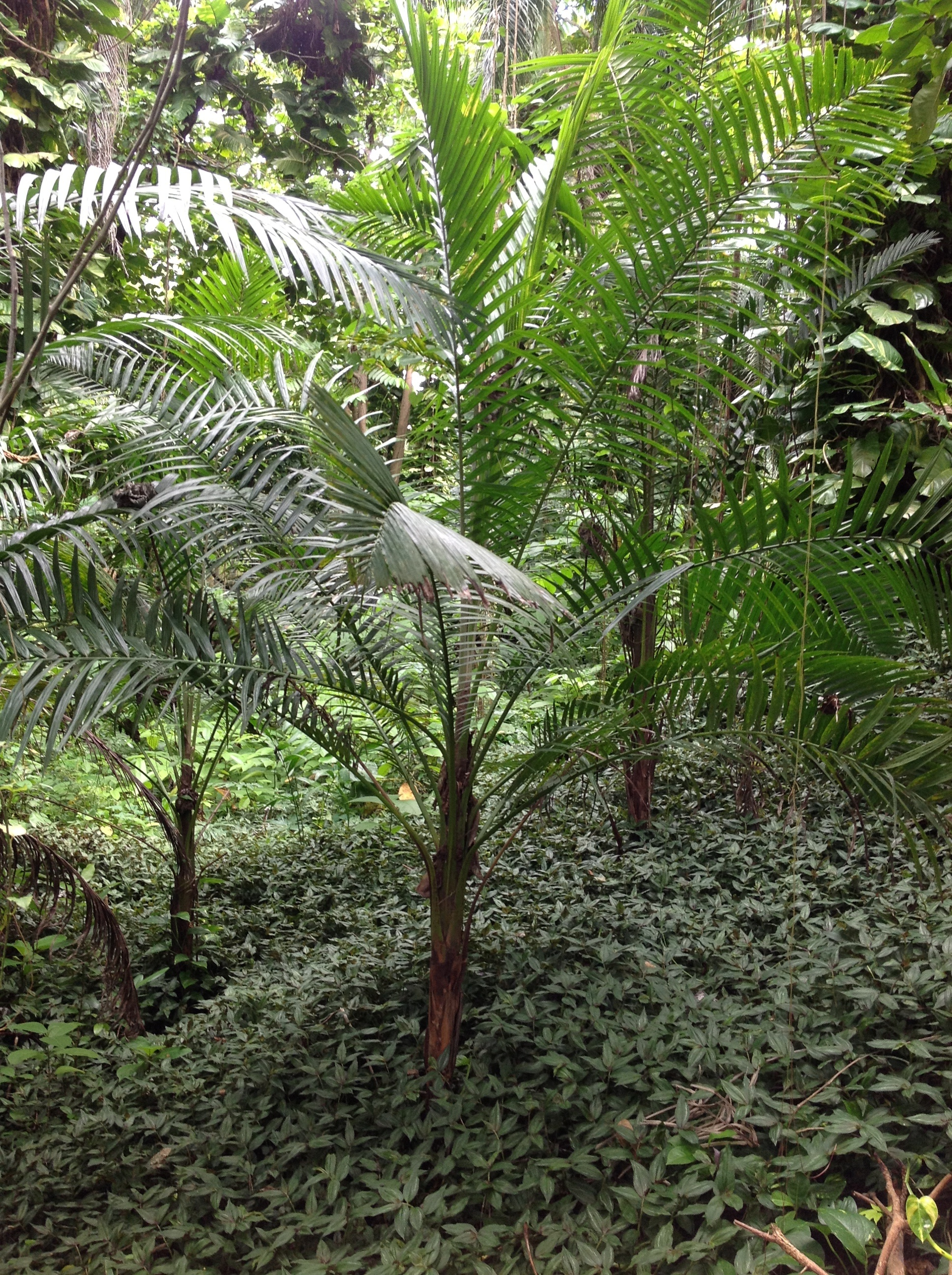
- Reinhardtia paiewonskiana

Scientific classification
- Kingdom: Plantae
- Clade: Tracheophytes
- Clade: Angiosperms
- Clade: Monocots
- Clade: Commelinids
- Order: Arecales
- Family: Arecaceae
- Subfamily: Arecoideae
- Tribe: Reinhardtieae
- Genus: Reinhardtia; Liebm.

Synonyms
- Malortiea H.Wendl.

= Reinhardtia =

Genus of palms

Reinhardtia is a genus in the palm family native to the northern Neotropics. It is a primarily Central American genus with five species distributed between southern Mexico and the extreme north of Colombia, and one isolated species, Reinhardtia paiewonskiana in the southwest of the Dominican Republic.

== Species ==
- Reinhardtia elegans Liebm. - Mexico (Oaxaca, Chiapas), Honduras
- Reinhardtia gracilis (H.Wendl.) Burret - Central America, Mexico (Oaxaca, Chiapas), Veracruz, Colombia
- Reinhardtia koschnyana (H.Wendl. & Dammer) Burret - Honduras, Nicaragua, Costa Rica, Panama, Colombia
- Reinhardtia latisecta (H.Wendl.) Burret - Belize, Honduras, Nicaragua, Costa Rica
- Reinhardtia paiewonskiana Read, Zanoni & M.M.Mejía - Dominican Republic
- Reinhardtia simplex (H.Wendl.) Burret - Mexico (Chiapas), Honduras, Nicaragua, Costa Rica, Panama, Colombia
