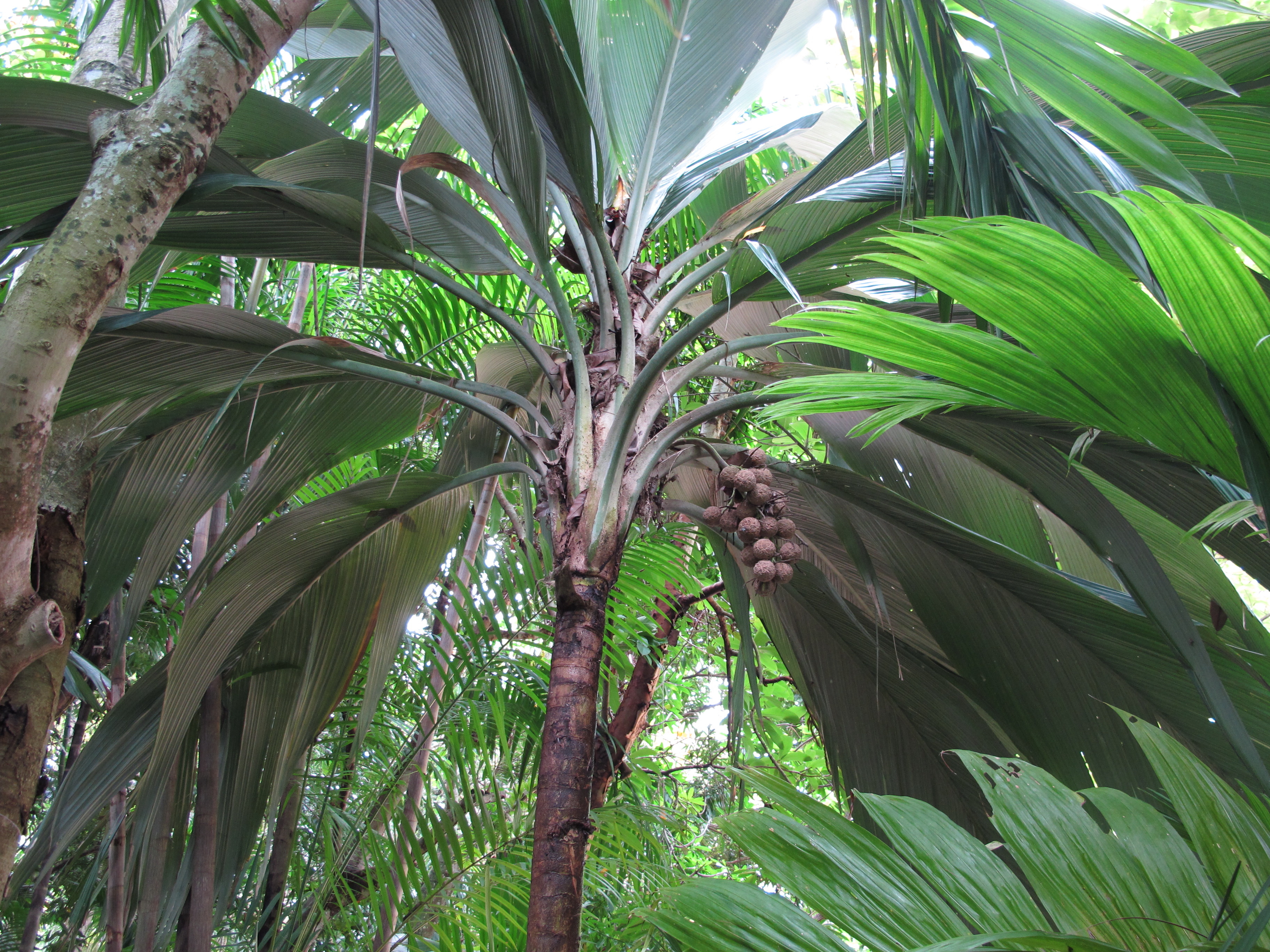
- Pelagodoxa henryana

Scientific classification
- Kingdom: Plantae
- Clade: Tracheophytes
- Clade: Angiosperms
- Clade: Monocots
- Clade: Commelinids
- Order: Arecales
- Family: Arecaceae
- Subfamily: Arecoideae
- Tribe: Pelagodoxeae
- Genus: Pelagodoxa; Becc. (1917)

= Pelagodoxa =

Genus of palms

Pelagodoxa is a genus of palm tree. It includes two species, P. henryana, which is native to the Marquesas Islands of French Polynesia, and P. mesocarpa, which is native to Vanuatu.

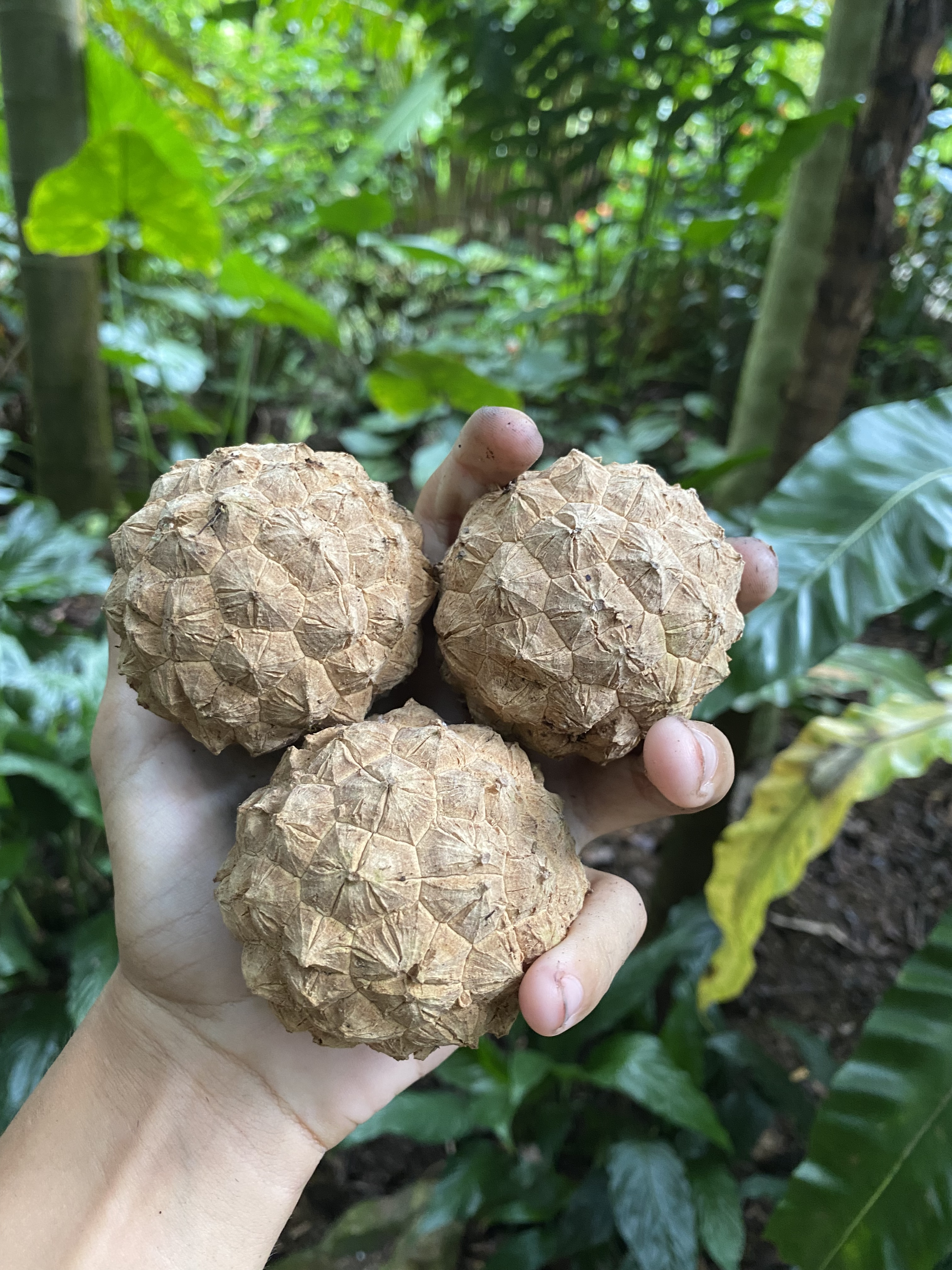
Mature P. mesocarpa fruit
