= Barcella =

Scientific classification
- Kingdom: Plantae
- Clade: Tracheophytes
- Clade: Angiosperms
- Clade: Monocots
- Clade: Commelinids
- Order: Arecales
- Family: Arecaceae
- Subfamily: Arecoideae
- Tribe: Cocoseae
- Genus: Barcella (Trail) Trail ex Drude
- Species: B. odora

Binomial name
- Barcella odora (Trail) Drude

Synonyms
- Elaeis odora Trail

Genus of palms

Barcella is a monotypic genus of flowering plant in the palm family found in the States of Amazonas and Roraima in northwestern Brazil. The only known species is Barcella odora which is used by the Brazilian peoples in construction and for various thatched goods.

== Description ==
The unarmed trunks of Barcella odora usually remain underground, producing 2 m arching leaves with pendent, lanceolate leaflets, 60 cm long and dark green in color. The leaflets are regularly arranged along the rachis, once-folded, with a prominent midrib and a tapering apex. They are monoecious with male and female flowers on a single plant, the interfoliar inflorescences are once branched with both pistillate and staminate flowers containing three sepals and three petals. The 3 cm ovoid fruit mature to a bright orange color each with one seed.

Barcella and the closely related genus Elaeis form a taxon within Cocoseae represented by their large pistilate flowers sunken in the rachillae, as well as endocarp pores. Elaeis is distinguished from Barcella by the presence of petiole spines and a fibrous, rather than woody, bract.

== Distribution and habitat ==
These palms are found at low altitudes along the Rio Negro river and its tributaries, growing in campinarana (sandy scrubland).
