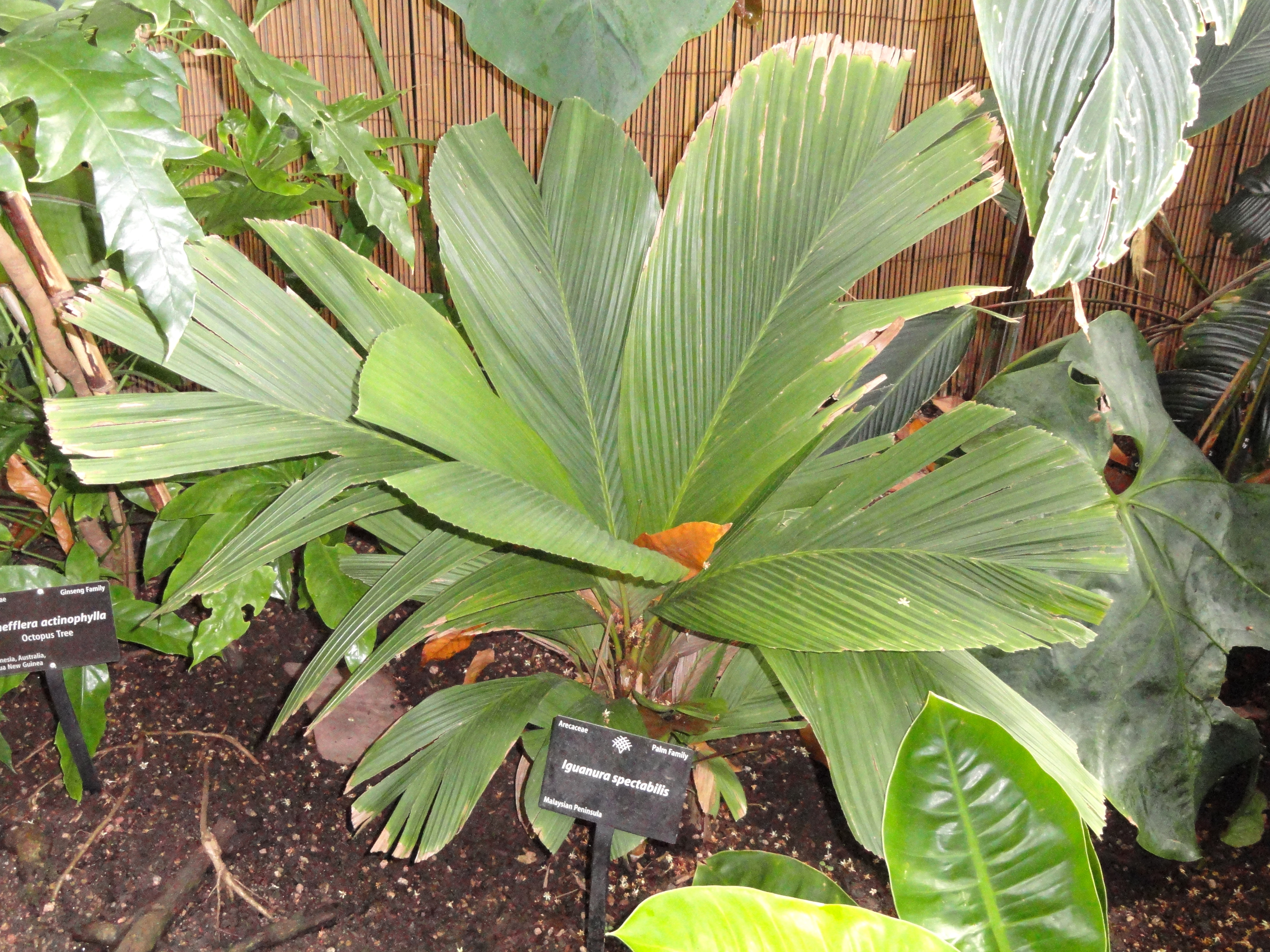
- Iguanura wallichiana var. major

Scientific classification
- Kingdom: Plantae
- Clade: Tracheophytes
- Clade: Angiosperms
- Clade: Monocots
- Clade: Commelinids
- Order: Arecales
- Family: Arecaceae
- Subfamily: Arecoideae
- Tribe: Areceae
- Genus: Iguanura; Blume

Species
- Iguanura ambigua; Iguanura asli; Iguanura bicornis; Iguanura borneensis; Iguanura cemurung; Iguanura chaiana; Iguanura curvata; Iguanura divergens; Iguanura elegans; Iguanura geonomaeformis; Iguanura humilis; Iguanura kelantanensis; Iguanura leucocarpa; Iguanura macrostachya; Iguanura melinauensis; Iguanura minor; Iguanura mirabilis; Iguanura myochodoides; Iguanura namsabiensis; Iguanura palmuncula; Iguanura parvula; Iguanura polymorpha; Iguanura prolifera; Iguanura remotiflora; Iguanura ruthiae; Iguanura sanderiana; Iguanura wallichiana

= Iguanura =

Genus of palms

Iguanura is a genus of monoecious flowering plants in the palm family from Southeast Asia, commonly called pinang. Closely related to the Heterospathe palms, they are noted for producing a wide variety of fruit forms. Its name combines the Spanish word for "lizard" with the Greek word for "tail".

== Distribution and habitat ==
Often forming large colonies, they grow throughout the peninsulas of Thailand, Myanmar, Malaysia, Borneo, and Sumatra, growing in tropical rain forest and in mountainous forest up to 1200 m.

== Description ==
This taxon is composed of very small, undergrowth palms which may be solitary or clustering, rarely exceeding 4 m in height. Stilt roots form in some species and most lack a crownshaft. The leaves may be regularly or irregularly pinnate, with or without a notched apex, entire or segmented; all have toothed margins. Many produce new leaves of various colours which are unusually long-lasting; the mature green leaves are especially persistent and will often become host to algae or various epiphytes over time.

The inflorescence usually emerges within the leaf crown but emerges below in those with rudimentary crownshafts. It is branched or spicate, and contains male and female flowers, both with three sepals and three petals. Of the bees, wasps, ants and flies observed visiting the male flowers, only the ants were also consistent visitors to the female flowers. The fruit may be spherical or egg-shaped, bilobed, spindle-shaped, or flat and five-pointed, and is green, white, brown, pink or red. The fruit carries one seed which usually takes the shape of the endocarp.

The species Iguanura palmuncula is the shortest of all palms, in the variety G. p. var. palmunculus reaching a height of only 20 cm (7.9 in) Although the shortest, it is not the least massive, for which see Chamaedorea tuerckheimii.

== Cultivation and uses ==
While generally decorative, their particular tropical needs have prevented much widespread cultivation. The leaves may be used for temporary shelters and the roots and fruit of I. wallichiana are reported to have contraceptive properties.
