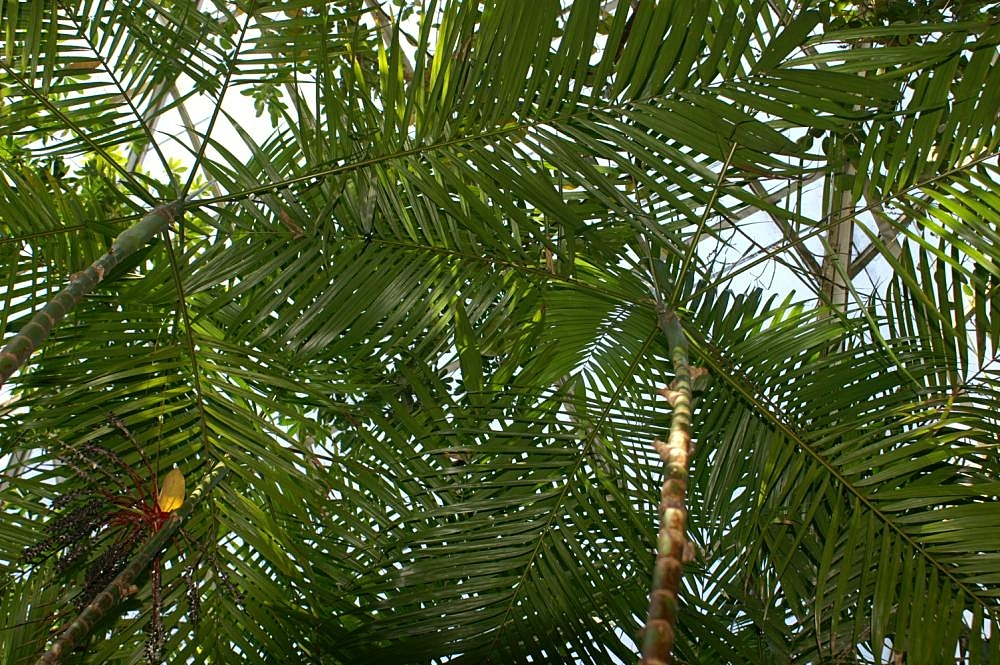
- Hyospathe elegans

Scientific classification
- Kingdom: Plantae
- Clade: Tracheophytes
- Clade: Angiosperms
- Clade: Monocots
- Clade: Commelinids
- Order: Arecales
- Family: Arecaceae
- Subfamily: Arecoideae
- Tribe: Euterpeae
- Genus: Hyospathe; Mart.

= Hyospathe =

Genus of palms

Hyospathe is a genus of flowering plant in the family Arecaceae, native to South America and Central America. It contains the following species:

| Image | Scientific name | Distribution |
|---|---|---|
| | Hyospathe elegans Mart. | Costa Rica, Panama, Colombia, Venezuela, the Guianas, Ecuador, Peru, Brazil |
| | Hyospathe frontinensis A.J.Hend. | Colombia |
| | Hyospathe macrorhachis Burret | Ecuador |
| | Hyospathe peruviana A.J.Hend. | Huánuco region of Perú |
| | Hyospathe pittieri Burret | Colombia, Panamá, Venezuela |
| | Hyospathe wendlandiana Dammer ex Burret | Colombia (Antioquia) |
