= Hermann Wendland =

German botanist and gardener (1825–1903)

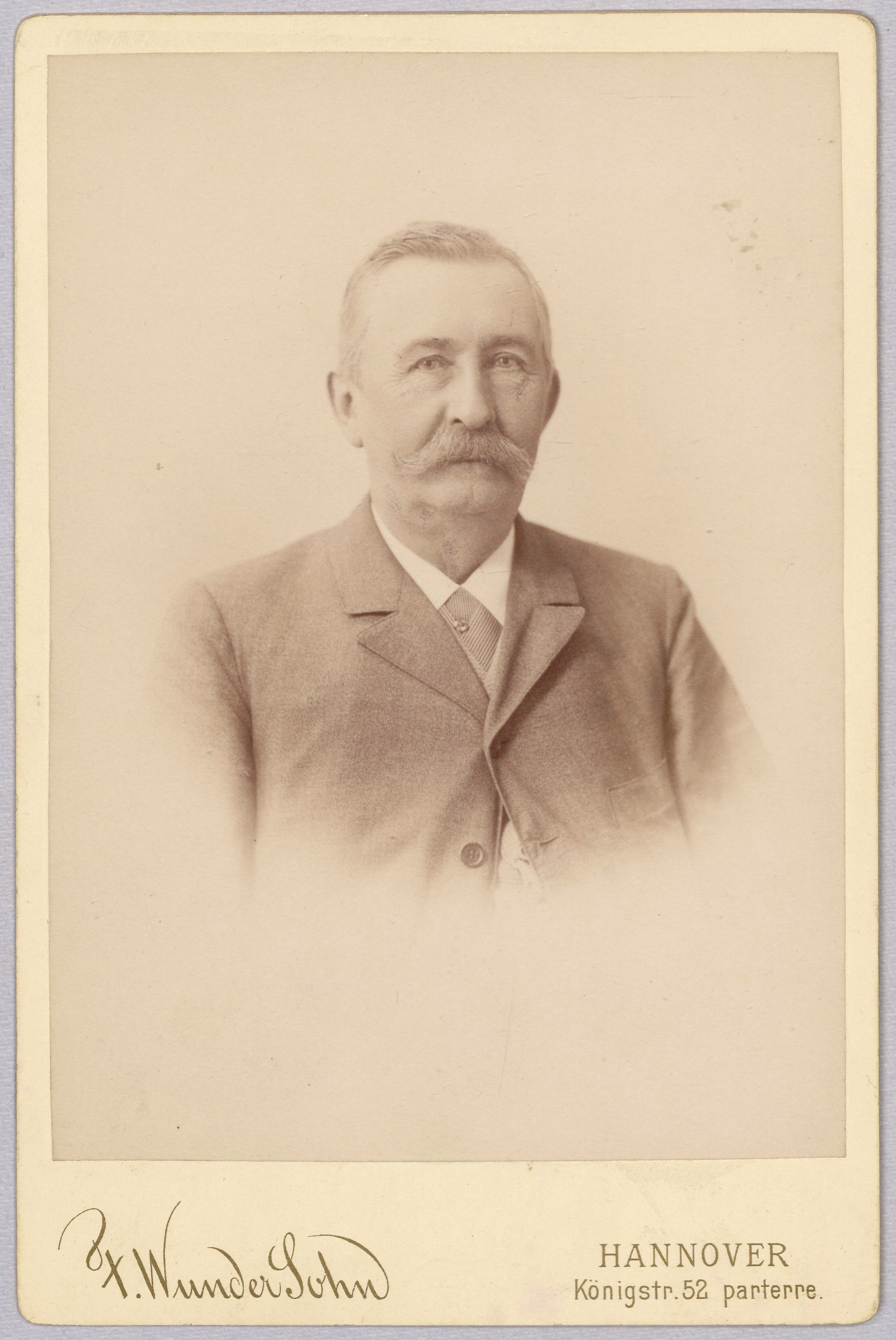

Johann Bernhard Daniel Hermann Wendland (October 11, 1825 in Herrenhausen – January 12, 1903 in Hanover) was a Kew-trained German botanist and the third generation of the Wendland family to serve as head gardener at the Royal botanical gardens at Herrenhausen, Hanover.

== Life and work ==
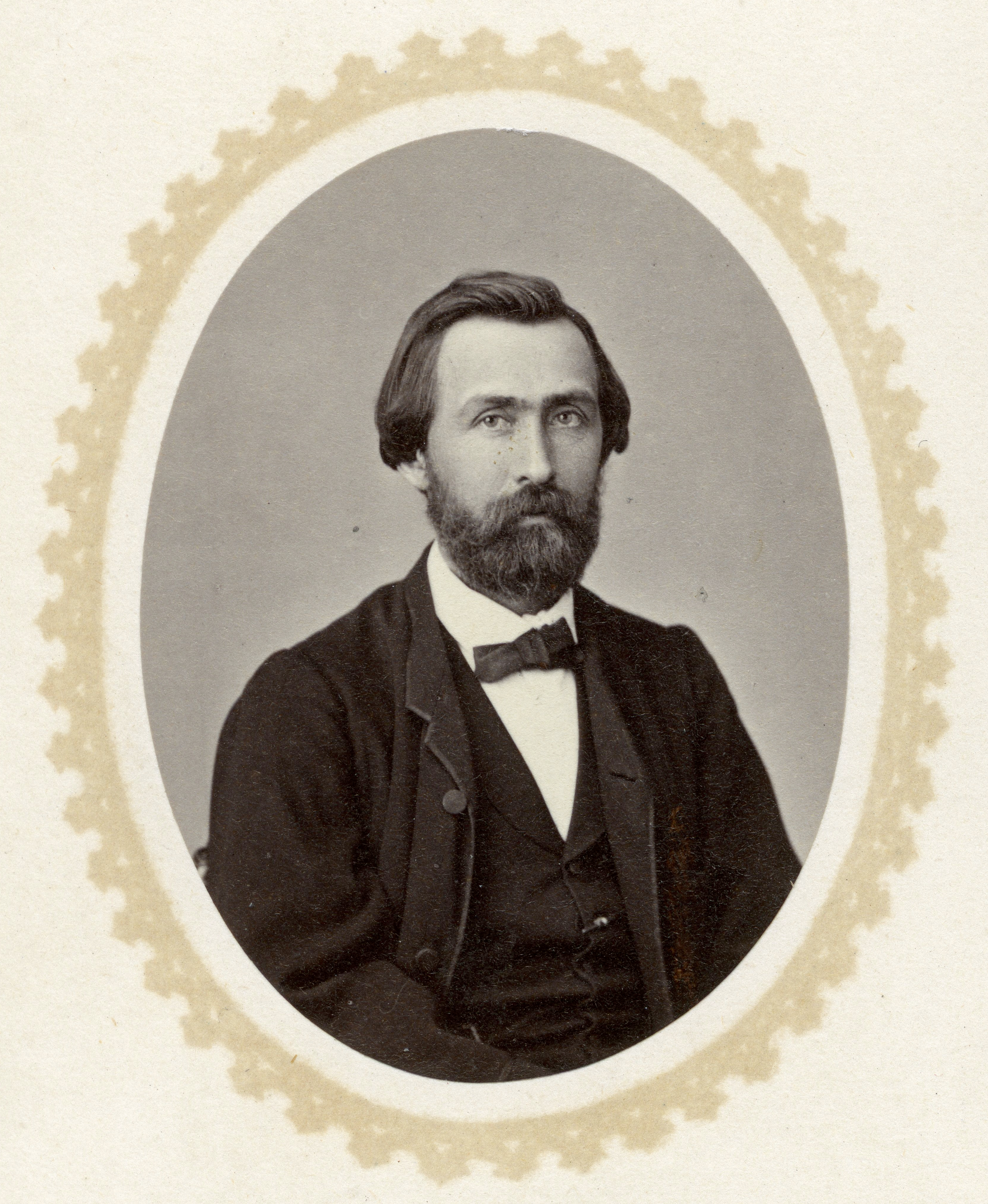

Wendland was born in Herrenhausen. He came from a family tradition of gardening and his father Heinrich Ludolph Wendland (1792–1869) was director of the Royal Gardens in Herrenhausen. His grandfather Johann Christoph Wendland (1755–1828) had also directed the gardens. He went to the Court School and received private tutorials in languages. In 1841 he trained under his father followed by training at Berlin under Carl David Bouché in Schöneberg. He then went in 1845 to the Georg-August University in Göttingen to train under Professor Friedrich Gottlieb Bartling and then under Heinrich Wilhelm Schott at Schonbrunn near Vienna. He also worked on the garden of Baron Charles von Hügel at Hietzing near Vienna. He then went to Kew and trained as a gardener until 1849. In 1854 he made a catalogue of the cultivated palms of Europe. In 1857-58 he went to South America on a botanical expedition along with the orchid trader George Ure Skinner (1804–67) and collected in Guatemala and central America. Anthurium scherzerianum was one of his discoveries. In 1870 he succeeded his father as director at Herrenhausen where he specialized in growing a wide range of palm species many of which were described by H. G. L. Reichenbach. He became a noted authority on the family Arecaceae (palms), on which he published a major monograph which formed the basis for the modern classification of the family, including many of the generic names currently in use.

The South American palm genus Wendlandiella is named after him. The genus Wendlandia is named after his grandfather.

== Publications ==
- Die Königlichen Gärten zu Herrenhausen bei Hannover (Hannover, 1852)
- Index palmarum, cyclanthearum, pandanearum, cycadearum, quae in hortis europaeis coluntur (Hannover, 1854).
