= List of Arecaceae genera by alphabetical order =

List of accepted genera in Arecaceae, the palm family, arranged alphabetically.

== A ==
- Acanthophoenix H.Wendl.
- Acoelorraphe H.Wendl.
- Acrocomia Mart.
- Actinokentia Dammer – synonym of Chambeyronia
- Actinorhytis H.Wendl. & Drude
- Adonidia Becc.
- Aiphanes Willd.
- Allagoptera Nees
- Alloschmidia H.E.Moore – synonym of Basselinia
- Alsmithia H.E.Moore – synonym of Heterospathe
- Ammandra O.F.Cook
- Aphandra Barfod
- Archontophoenix H.Wendl. & Drude
- Areca L.
- Arenga Labill. ex DC.
- Asterogyne H.Wendl.
- Astrocaryum G.Mey.
- Attalea Kunth

== B ==
- Bactris Jacq.
- Balaka Becc.
- Barcella (Trail) Drude
- Basselinia Vieill.
- Beccariophoenix Jum. & H.Perrier
- Bentinckia Berry ex Roxb.
- Bismarckia Hildebrandt & H.Wendl.
- Borassodendron Becc.
- Borassus L.
- Brahea Mart. ex Endl.
- Brassiophoenix Burret
- Brongniartikentia Becc. – synonym of Clinosperma
- Burretiokentia Pic.Serm.
- Butia (Becc.) Becc.
- × Butyagrus Vorster (Butia × Syagrus)

== C ==
- Calamus L.
- Calospatha Becc. – synonym of Calamus
- Calyptrocalyx Blume
- Calyptrogyne H.Wendl.
- Calyptronoma Griseb.
- Campecarpus H.Wendl. ex Becc.
- Carpentaria Becc.
- Carpoxylon H.Wendl. & Drude
- Caryota L.
- Ceratolobus Blume – synonym of Calamus
- Ceroxylon Bonpl. ex DC.
- Chamaedorea Willd.
- Chamaerops L.
- Chambeyronia Vieill.
- Chelyocarpus Dammer
- Chrysalidocarpus H.Wendl.
- Chuniophoenix Burret
- Clinosperma Becc.
- Clinostigma H.Wendl.
- Coccothrinax Sarg.
- Cocos L.
- Colpothrinax Griseb. & H.Wendl.
- Copernicia Mart. ex Endl.
- Corypha L.
- Cryosophila Blume
- Cyphokentia Brongn.
- Cyphophoenix H.Wendl. ex Hook.f.
- Cyphosperma H.Wendl. ex Hook.f.
- Cyrtostachys Blume

== D ==
- Deckenia H.Wendl. ex Seem.
- Desmoncus Mart.
- Dictyocaryum H.Wendl.
- Dictyosperma H.Wendl. & Drude
- Dransfieldia W.J.Baker & Zona
- Drymophloeus Zipp.
- Dypsis Noronha ex Mart.

== E ==
- Elaeis Jacq.
- Eleiodoxa (Becc.) Burret
- Eremospatha (G.Mann & H.Wendl.) Schaedtler
- Eugeissona Griff.
- Euterpe Mart.

== G ==
- Gaussia H.Wendl.
- Geonoma Willd.
- Guihaia J.Dransf., S.K.Lee & F.N.Wei

== H ==
- Hedyscepe H.Wendl. & Drude
- Hemithrinax Hook.f.
- Heterospathe Scheff.
- Howea Becc.
- Hydriastele H.Wendl. & Drude
- Hyophorbe Gaertn.
- Hyospathe Mart.
- Hyphaene Gaertn.

== I ==
- Iguanura Blume
- Iriartea Ruiz & Pav.
- Iriartella H.Wendl.
- Itaya H.E.Moore

== J ==
- Jailoloa Heatubun & W.J.Baker
- Johannesteijsmannia H.E.Moore
- Juania Drude
- Jubaea Kunth
- Jubaeopsis Becc.

== K ==
- Kentiopsis Brongn. – synonym of Chambeyronia
- Kerriodoxa J.Dransf.
- Korthalsia Blume

== L ==
- Laccospadix H.Wendl. & Drude
- Laccosperma (G.Mann & H.Wendl.) Drude
- Lanonia A.J.Hend. & C.D.Bacon
- Latania Comm. ex Juss.
- †Latanites Massalongo (1858)
- Lavoixia H.E.Moore – synonym of Clinosperma
- Lemurophoenix J.Dransf.
- Leopoldinia Mart.
- Lepidocaryum Mart.
- Lepidorrhachis (H.Wendl. & Drude) O.F.Cook
- Leucothrinax C.Lewis & Zona
- Licuala Wurmb
- Linospadix H.Wendl.
- Livistona R.Br.
- Lodoicea Comm. ex DC.
- Loxococcus H.Wendl. & Drude

== M ==
- Manicaria Gaertn.
- Manjekia W.J.Baker & Heatubun
- Marojejya Humbert
- Masoala Jum.
- Mauritia L.f.
- Mauritiella Burret
- Maxburretia Furtado
- Medemia Wurttemb. ex H.Wendl.
- Metroxylon Rottb.
- Moratia H.E.Moore – synonym of Cyphokentia
- Myrialepis Becc.

== N ==
- Nannorrhops H.Wendl.
- Nenga H.Wendl. & Drude
- Neonicholsonia Dammer
- Neoveitchia Becc.
- Nephrosperma Balf.f.
- Normanbya F.Muell. ex Becc.
- Nypa Steck

== O ==
- Oenocarpus Mart.
- Oncocalamus (G.Mann & H.Wendl.) Hook.f.
- Oncosperma Blume
- Orania Zipp.
- Oraniopsis J.Dransf., A.K.Irvine & N.W.Uhl

== P ==
- Parajubaea Burret
- Pelagodoxa Becc.
- Phoenicophorium H.Wendl.
- Phoenix L.
- Pholidocarpus Blume
- Pholidostachys H.Wendl. ex Hook.f.
- Physokentia Becc.
- Phytelephas Ruiz & Pav.
- Pigafetta (Blume) Becc.
- Pinanga Blume
- Plectocomia Mart. ex Blume
- Plectocomiopsis Becc.
- Podococcus G.Mann & H.Wendl.
- Pogonotium J.Dransf. – synonym of Calamus
- Polyandrococos Barb.Rodr. – synonym of Allagoptera
- Ponapea Becc.
- Prestoea Hook.f.
- Pritchardia Seem. & H.Wendl.
- Pritchardiopsis Becc. – synonym of Saribus
- Pseudophoenix H.Wendl. ex Sarg.
- Ptychococcus Becc.
- Ptychosperma Labill.

== R ==
- Raphia P.Beauv.
- Ravenea H.Wendl. ex C.D.Bouche
- Reinhardtia Liebm.
- Retispatha J.Dransf. – synonym of Calamus
- Rhapidophyllum H.Wendl. & Drude
- Rhapis L.f. ex Aiton
- Rhopaloblaste Scheff.
- Rhopalostylis H.Wendl. & Drude
- Roscheria H.Wendl. ex Balf.f.
- Roystonea O.F.Cook

== S ==
- Sabal Adans.
- Sabinaria R.Bernal & Galeano
- Salacca Reinw.
- Saribus Blume
- Satakentia H.E.Moore
- Satranala J.Dransf. & Beentje
- Schippia Burret
- Sclerosperma G.Mann & H.Wendl.
- Serenoa Hook.f.
- Socratea H.Karst.
- Solfia Rech. – synonym of Balaka
- Sommieria Becc.
- Syagrus Mart.
- Synechanthus H.Wendl.

== T ==
- Tahina J.Dransf. & Rakotoarin.
- Tectiphiala H.E.Moore
- Thrinax L.f. ex Sw.
- Trachycarpus H.Wendl.
- Trithrinax Mart.
- Truongsonia A.J.Hend., N.S.Lý, W.J.Baker, S.Bellot, J.Dransf. & Eiserhar

== V ==
- Veillonia H.E.Moore
- Veitchia H.Wendl.
- Verschaffeltia H.Wendl.
- Voanioala J.Dransf.
- Vonitra Becc.

== W ==
- Wallaceodoxa Heatubun & W.J.Baker
- Wallichia Roxb.
- Washingtonia H.Wendl.
- Welfia H.Wendl.
- Wendlandiella Dammer
- Wettinia Poepp.
- Wodyetia Irvine

== Z ==
- Zombia L.H.Bailey
