= Climbing palm =

Palms that grows as vines

Climbing palms are genera in the family Arecaceae that grow as lianas. Initially erect, the slender stems seek out trees for support and climb up into the forest canopy by means of recurved hooks and spines growing on the stem, leaves and inflorescences. In all climbing palms the leaves are pinnate and grow along the stem instead of forming a dense crown. The stems of climbing palms, more often referred to as canes, are solid in contrast to bamboo poles which are almost always hollow. The majority of climbing palms are also clumping palms [and sympodial], sending out new shoots from [below ground as suckers]. About 600 species of palms in genera have a climbing growth habit. Most noteworthy is the genus Calamus–the largest genus in the palm family with approximately 350 described species--source of nearly all commercial rattan.

The habit of climbing palm is one of the terms used for referring to the diversity of habits of palm stems, the rest are arborescent palms or tree palms, shrub palms and acaulescent palms, as defined in Dransfield (1978 cited in Kubitzki ed. 1998, see also Uhl & Dransfield 1987 Genera Palmarum).

== Gallery ==
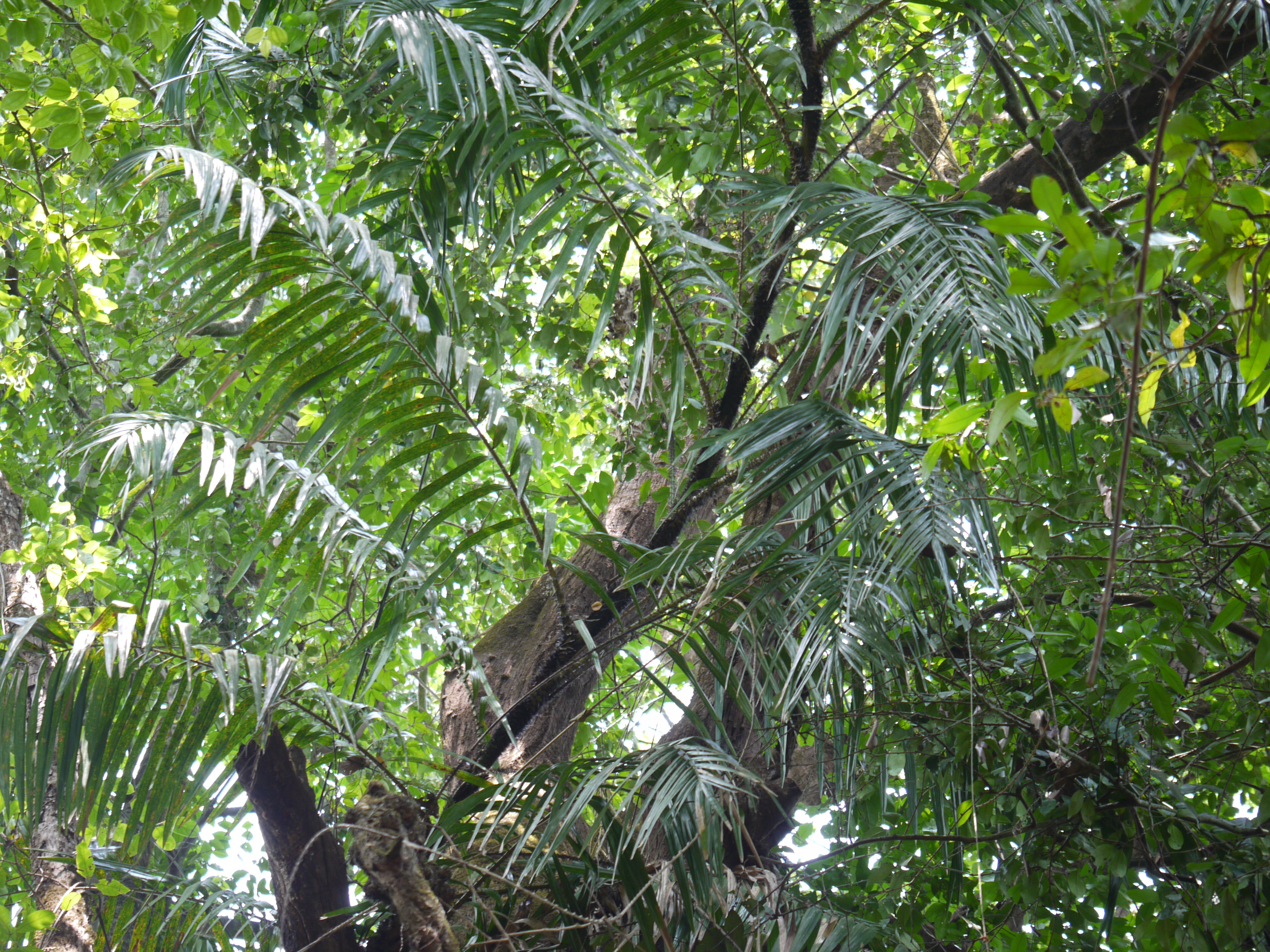
Calamus thwaitesii which is a species of climbing palm climbing a tree

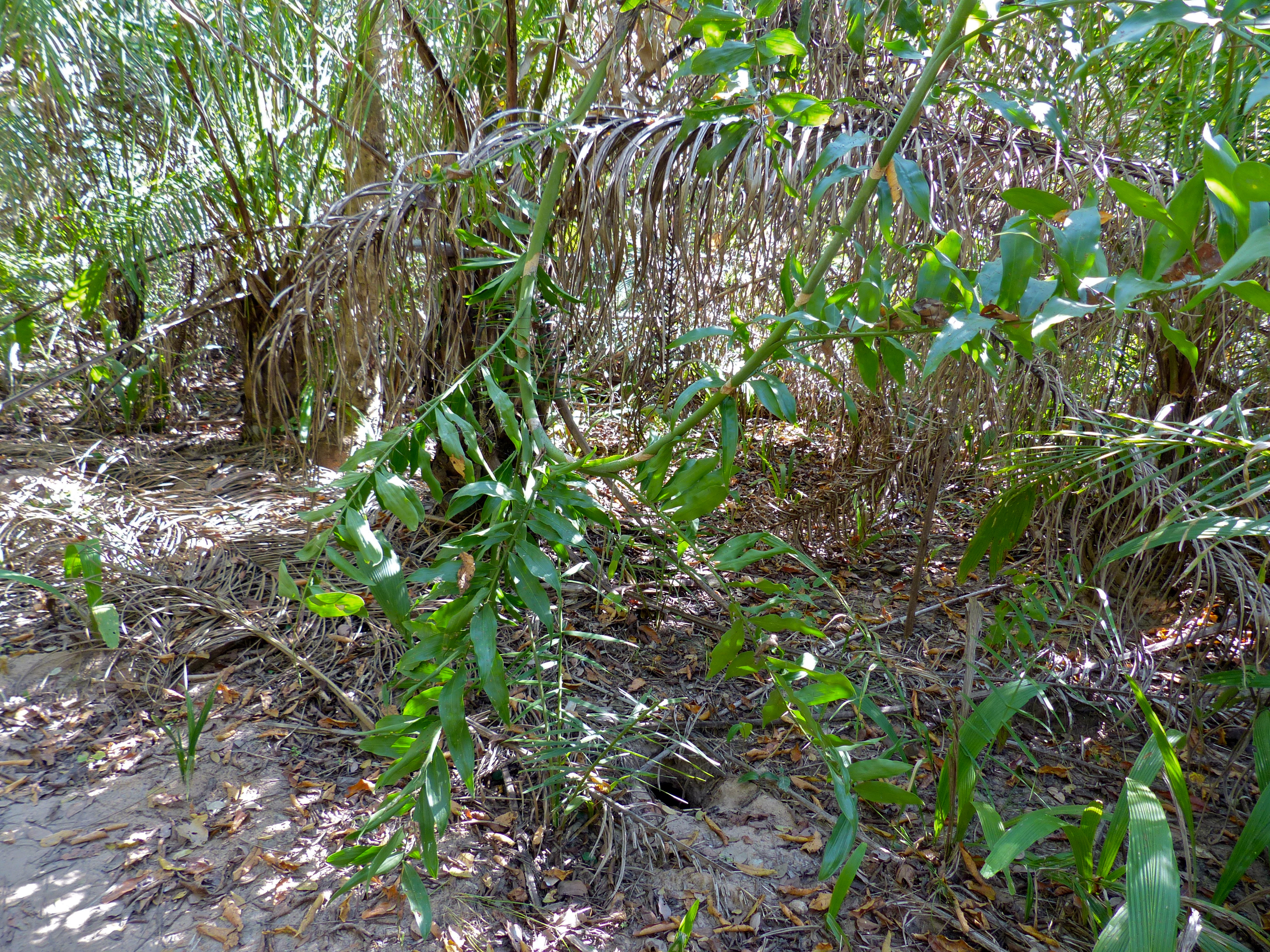
Desmoncus orthacanthos is a climbing palm found in the New World.

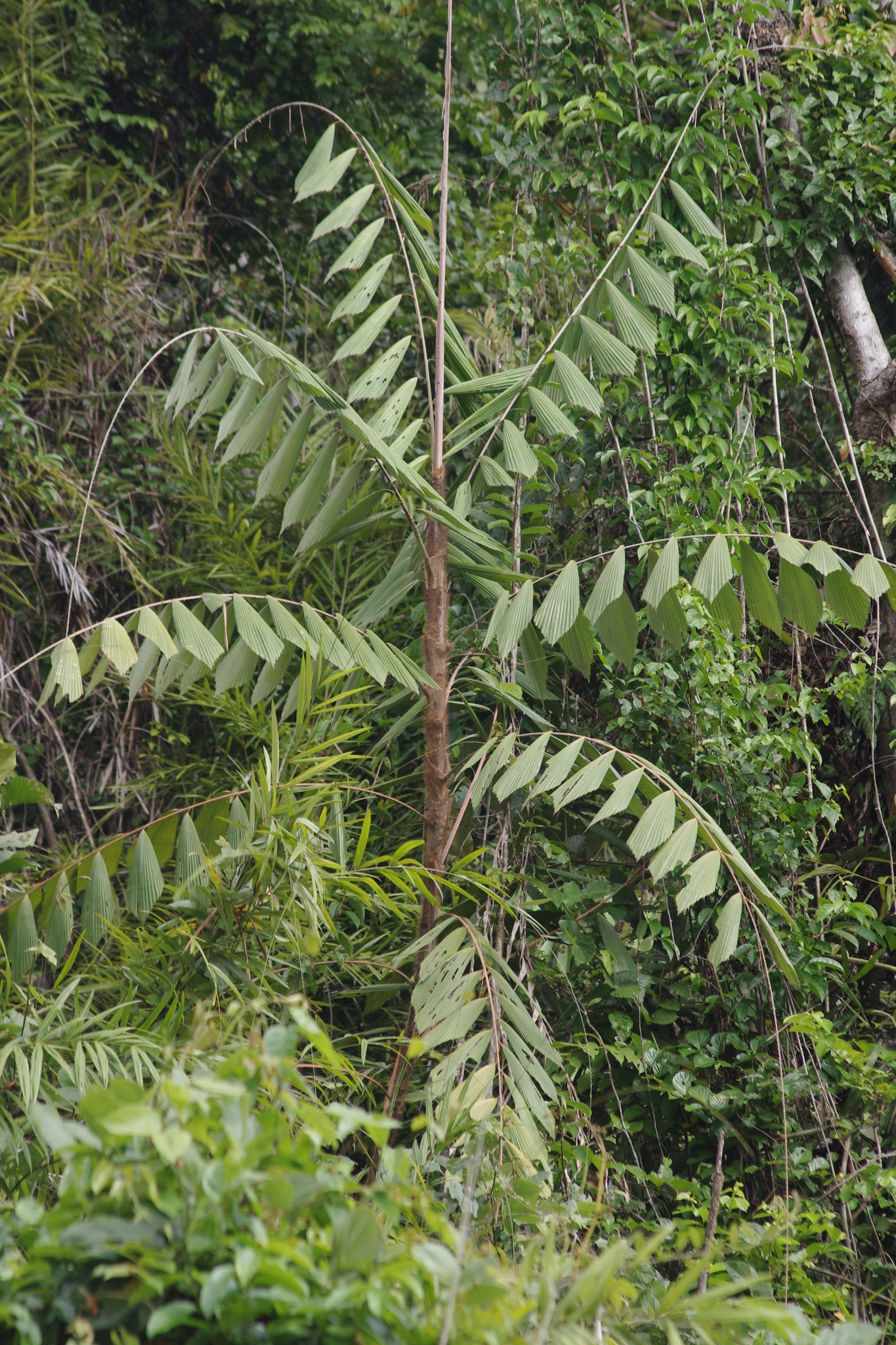
Korthalsia zippelii

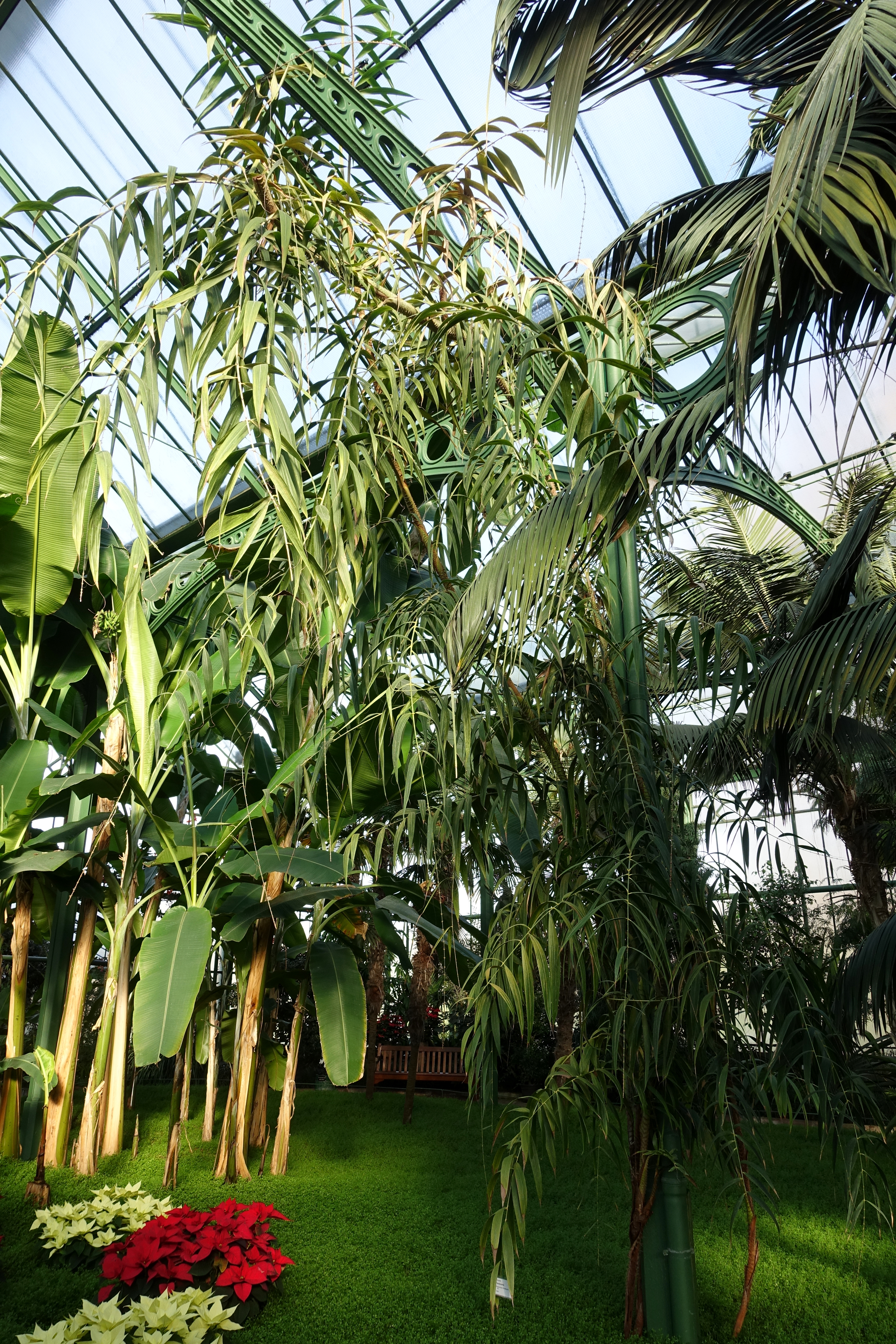
Plectocomia, a climbing palm from Southeast Asia

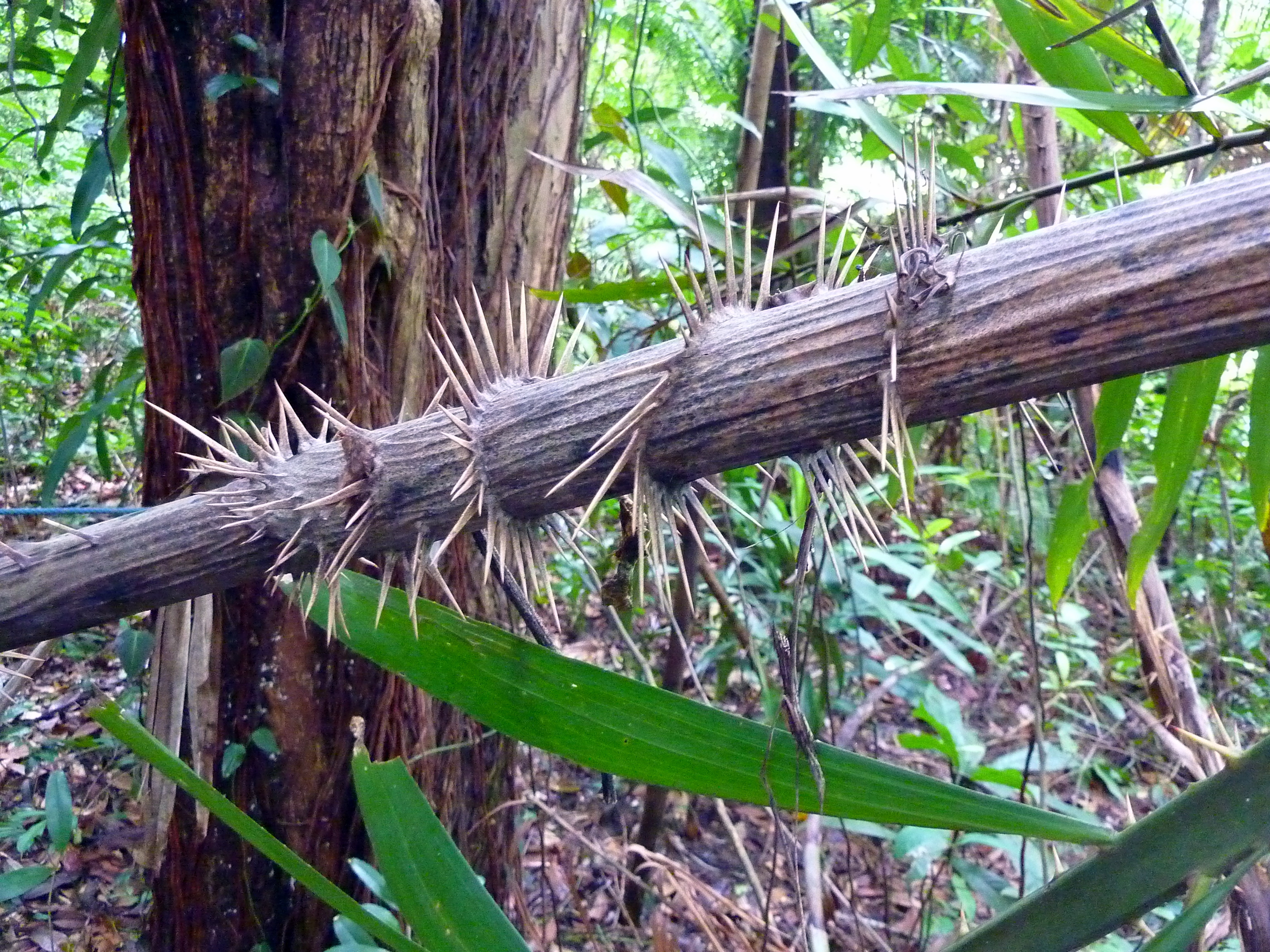
Myrialepis

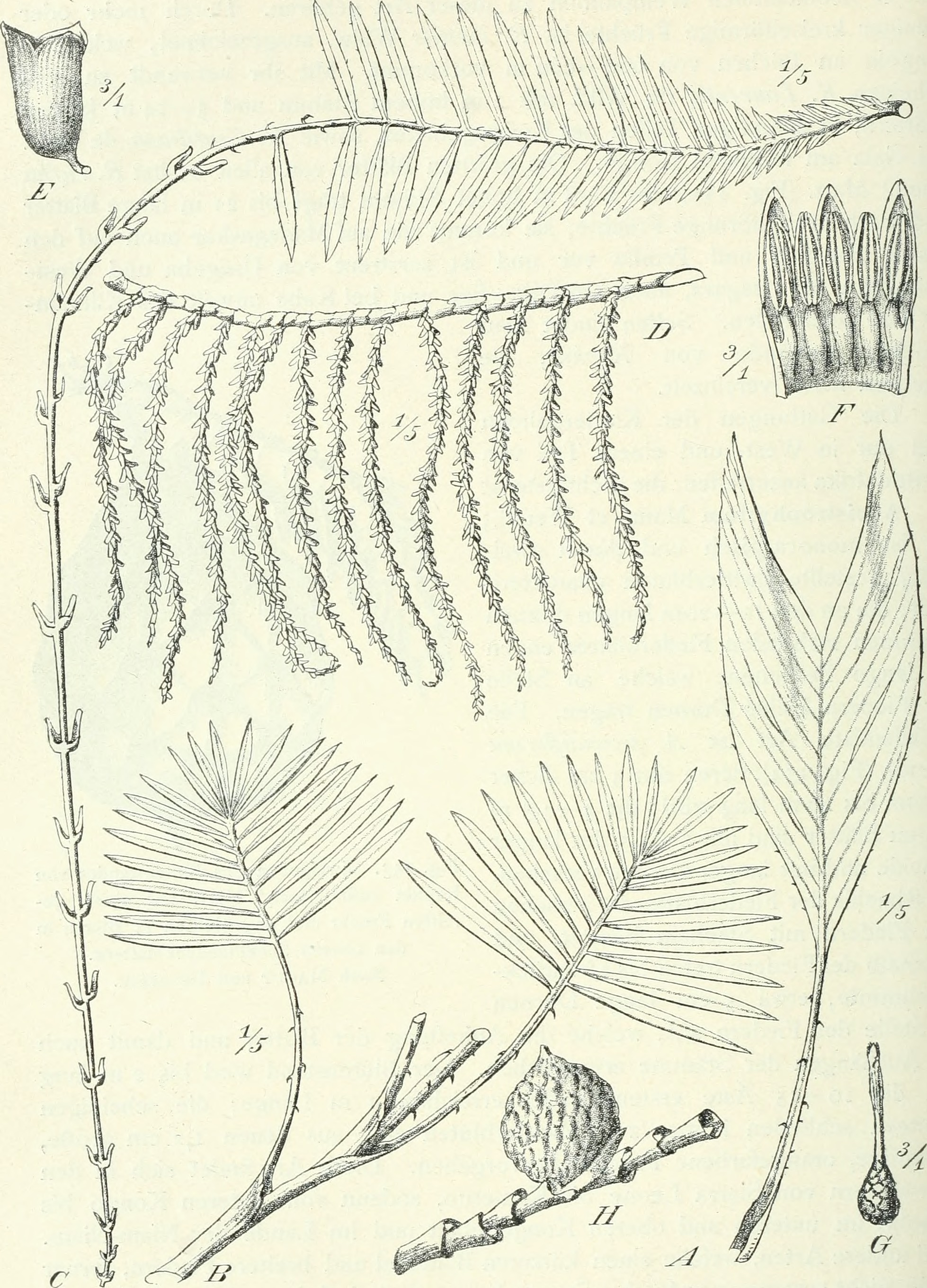
Laccosperma secundiflorum, a climbing palm

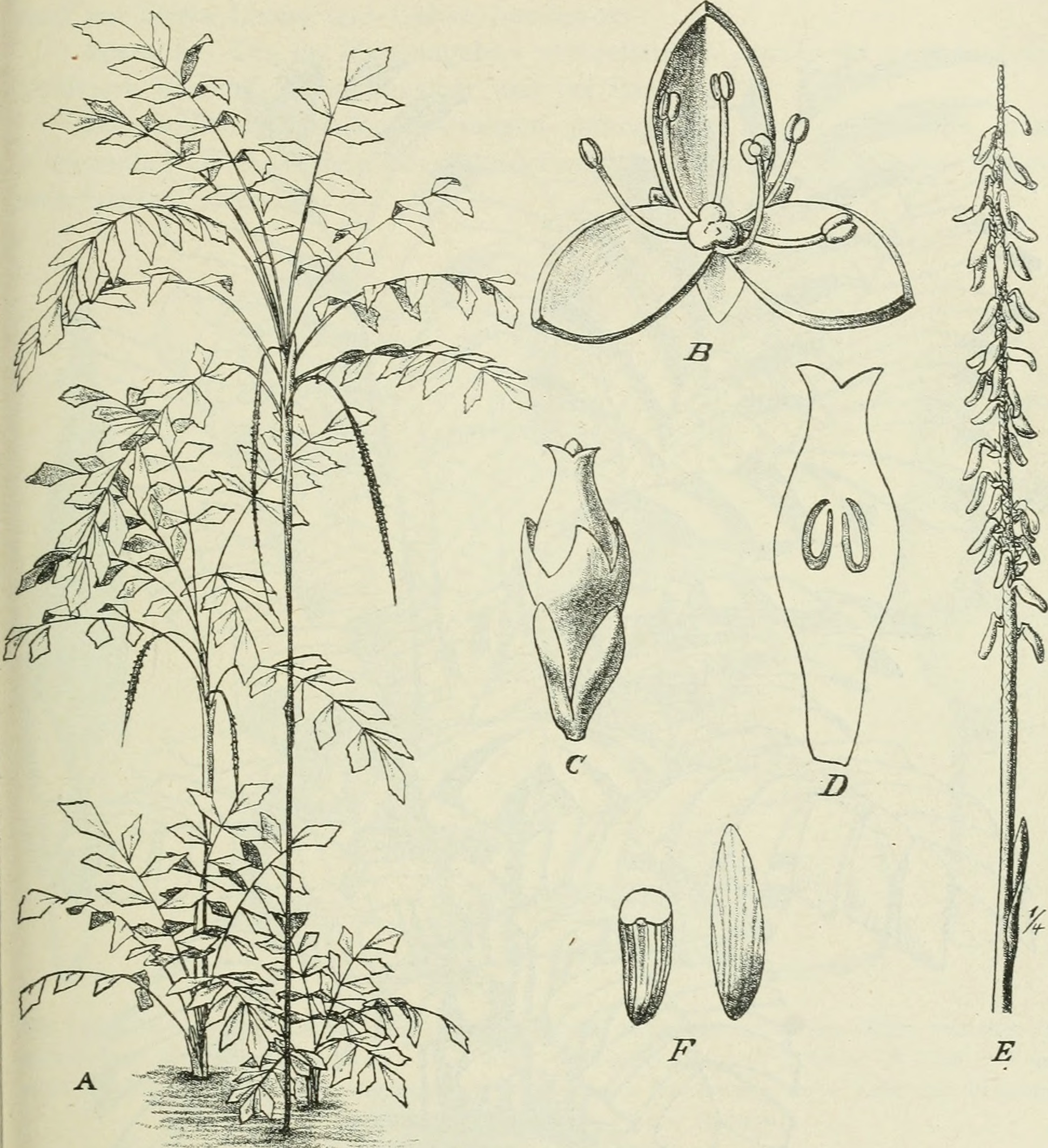
Oncocalamus

== Diversity ==
Most climbing palms are the ones called rattan. Rattans are closely related, and all belong to the family Calamoideae, most of them in the tribe Calameae. The genera: Calamus, principally, also Korthalsia, Plectocomia, Plectocomiopsis, Myrialepis, Laccosperma (syn. Ancistrophyllum), Eremospatha and Oncocalamus. All rattans belong to the Old World.

In the New World there are 2 genera with climbing representatives, Chamaedorea (subfamily Ceroxyloideae, tribe Hyophorbeae) and Desmoncus (subfamily Arecoideae, tribe Cocoseae), the last one is utilized and commercialized much in the same way as rattans.

Dypsis scandens (subfamily Arecoideae, tribe Areceae) is a climbing palm in Madagascar.

== See also ==
- Rattan

== Bibliography ==
- TPL (2013). "The Plant List Version 1.1". Royal Botanic Gardens, Kew and Missouri Botanical Garden.
- Tomlinson, P. B.; Zimmerman, Martin, eds. (1978). Tropical Trees as Living Systems (Proceedings of the fourth Cabot Symposium held at Harvard Forest, Petersham Massachusetts on April 26-30, 1976). Cambridge University Press. ISBN 978-0-521-14247-2.
- Dransfield, John (10 June 2010). Growth forms of rain forest palms. Cambridge University Press. pp. 247–268. ISBN 9780521142472., in Tomlinson & Zimmerman (1978)
