= Salaccinae =

Scientific classification
- Kingdom: Plantae
- Clade: Tracheophytes
- Clade: Angiosperms
- Clade: Monocots
- Clade: Commelinids
- Order: Arecales
- Family: Arecaceae
- Subfamily: Calamoideae
- Tribe: Calameae
- Subtribe: Salaccinae

Tribe of palms

Salaccinae is a subtribe of plants in the family Arecaceae found in Southeast Asia. Genera in the subtribe are:

- Eleiodoxa – Malay Peninsula, Sumatra, Borneo
- Salacca – Malesia, Indochina

== See also ==
- List of Arecaceae genera
