= Plectocomiopsis hantu =

Scientific classification
- Kingdom: Plantae
- Clade: Tracheophytes
- Clade: Angiosperms
- Clade: Monocots
- Clade: Commelinids
- Order: Arecales
- Family: Arecaceae
- Genus: Plectocomiopsis
- Species: P. hantu

Binomial name
- Plectocomiopsis hantu Kuhnhäuser, J.Dransf. & W.J.Baker

Species of palm

Plectocomiopsis hantu is a species of rattan found in Borneo.

== Description ==
The undersides of the leaves are white. Multiple differences exist in the climbing palm when compared to other known Plectocomiopsis species, such as the texture of the leaflets. It is classified in the Plectocomiopsis genus due to morphological similarities.

== Discovery ==
The species had been reported multiple times before it was formally described. The earliest of these listed according to the paper was in West Kalimantan in 1932. However, there was not enough information in any of the specimens to classify them in certainty. It was not until 2024 that the plant was given a formal scientific name and classification.
