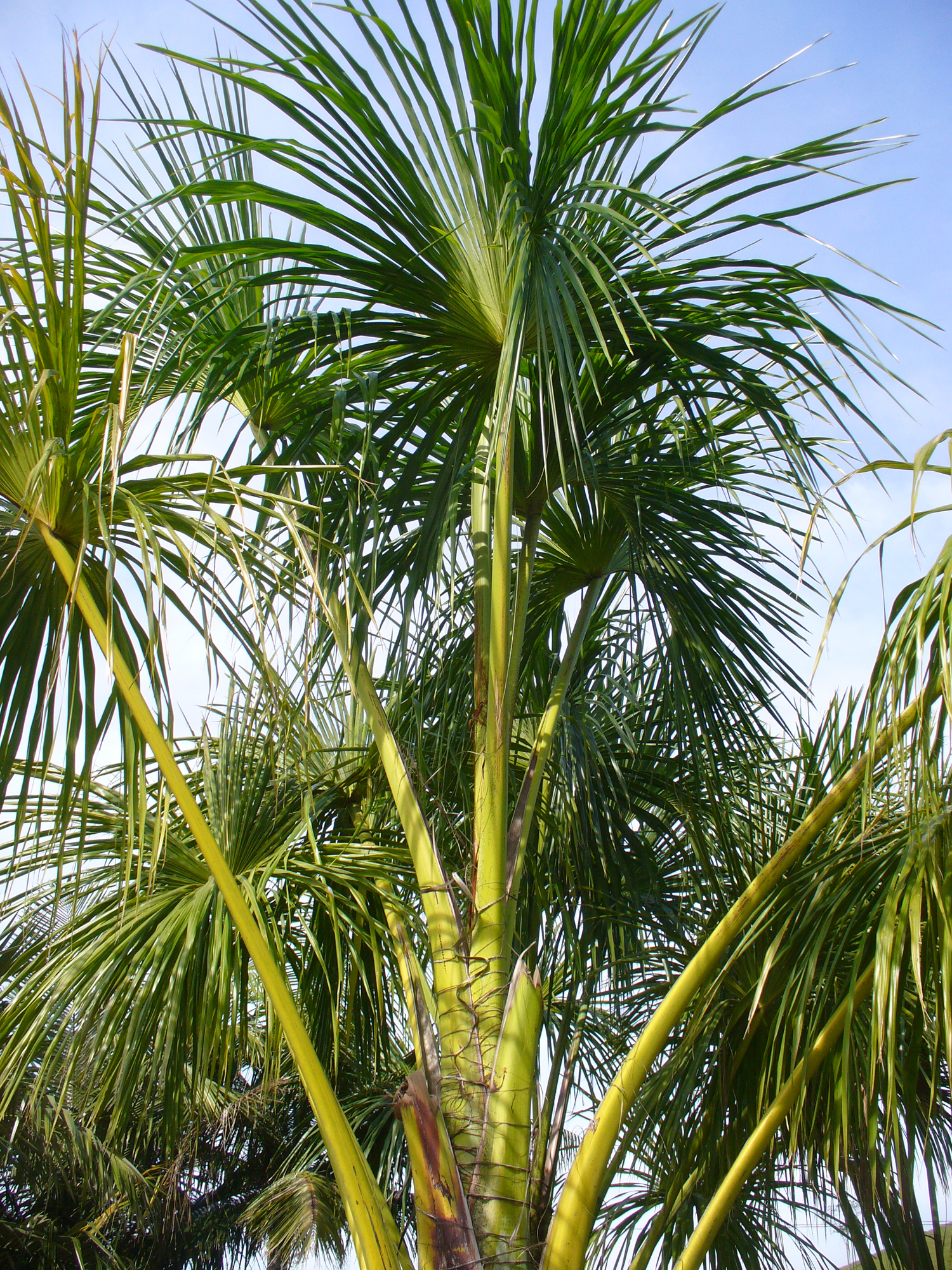
- Mauritia flexuosa (Scott Zona)

Scientific classification
- Kingdom: Plantae
- Clade: Tracheophytes
- Clade: Angiosperms
- Clade: Monocots
- Clade: Commelinids
- Order: Arecales
- Family: Arecaceae
- Subfamily: Calamoideae
- Tribe: Lepidocaryeae
- Subtribe: Mauritiinae

= Mauritiinae =

Tribe of palms

Mauritiinae is a subtribe of plants in the family Arecaceae found in northern South America. Genera in the subtribe are:

- Lepidocaryum
- Mauritia
- Mauritiella

== See also ==
- List of Arecaceae genera
