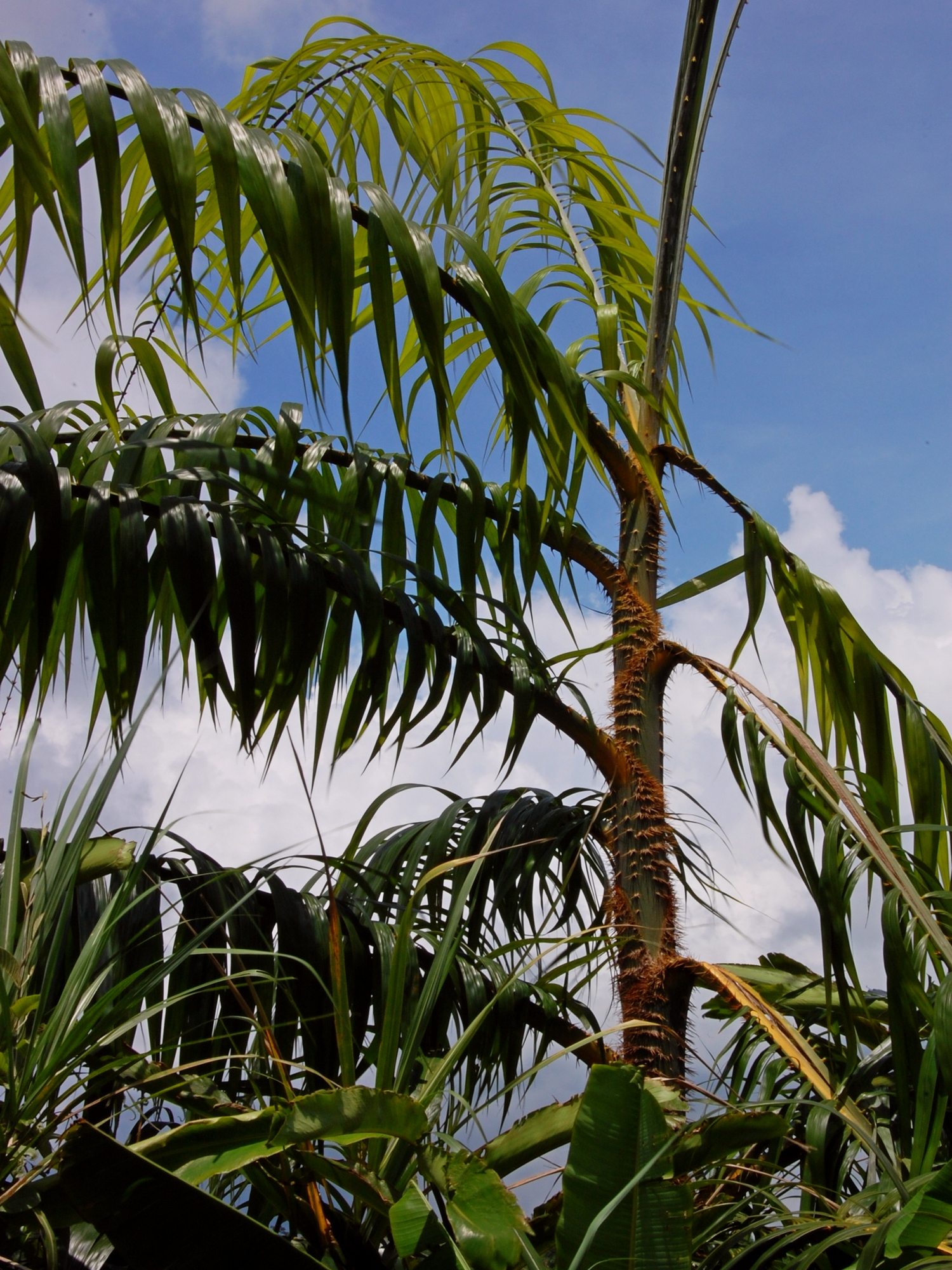
- Plectocomia elongata in Sukabumi, Indonesia

Scientific classification
- Kingdom: Plantae
- Clade: Embryophytes
- Clade: Tracheophytes
- Clade: Spermatophytes
- Clade: Angiosperms
- Clade: Monocots
- Clade: Commelinids
- Order: Arecales
- Family: Arecaceae
- Subfamily: Calamoideae
- Tribe: Calameae
- Subtribe: Plectocomiinae

= Plectocomiinae =

Tribe of palms

Plectocomiinae is a subtribe of plants in the family Arecaceae found in Southeast Asia. Genera in the subtribe are:

- Plectocomia – Malesia, Indochina
- Myrialepis – Malesia, Malay Peninsula, Sumatra

== See also ==
- List of Arecaceae genera
