= Pigafetta (disambiguation) =

Pigafetta may refer to:

- Antonio Pigafetta (c. 1491 – c. 1531), Venetian scholar and explorer
- Filippo Pigafetta (1533–1604), Venetian mathematician and explorer
- Pigafetta, a genus of palms
- 52558 Pigafetta, a main-belt asteroid
