= Eremospatha wendlandiana =

Scientific classification
- Kingdom: Plantae
- Clade: Tracheophytes
- Clade: Angiosperms
- Clade: Monocots
- Clade: Commelinids
- Order: Arecales
- Family: Arecaceae
- Genus: Eremospatha
- Species: E. wendlandiana

Binomial name
- Eremospatha wendlandiana Dammer ex Becc.

Species of plant

Eremospatha wendlandiana is a rattan-like liana of the family Arecaceae native to West Africa. The leaves are once-pinnate and the leaflets are dichotomously veined not unlike Ginkgo, but with a round form.

== Description ==
=== Stems ===
The stems can grow up to 60 m in length, making this one of the tallest climbing palms. They are circular in cross-section, with a diameter ranging from 12 to 20 mm without sheaths and 15 to 30 mm with sheaths. The internodes can reach up to 30 cm in length. The stem surface is generally lightly striated, covered with sparse to moderate black indumentum.

=== Leaves ===
The pinnate leaves extend up to 2 m long, with a cirrus of equal length. Each side of the rachis bears up to 20 leaflets, which are rhomboid or trapezoid in shape and arranged in a regular pattern. The leaflet margins are armed with black-tipped spines, and the apex is praemorse and slightly ciliate-spiny.

=== Inflorescence ===
The inflorescences grow up to 80 cm in length, with a curved or arching rachis. The rachillae are arranged in pairs, with flowers developing in close clusters along the axis.

=== Flowers ===
The flowers are borne in close pairs, with a calyx approximately 2 mm long and 4 mm wide. The corolla measures around 8 mm in length, and the stamens are fused into a short epipetalous ring. The ovary is small and topped with a minute style.

=== Fruit ===
The fruit is ovoid to broadly cylindrical, measuring 2.5–3.5 cm in length and 1.8–2.4 cm in diameter. It is covered in 15–19 vertical rows of protective scales. The seeds are compressed on one side, measuring 1.8–2.8 cm long and 1.2–1.8 cm wide, with a lateral embryo and a raised surface opposite the flattened side.
