= Oncocalamus =

Scientific classification
- Kingdom: Plantae
- Clade: Tracheophytes
- Clade: Angiosperms
- Clade: Monocots
- Clade: Commelinids
- Order: Arecales
- Family: Arecaceae
- Subfamily: Calamoideae
- Tribe: Lepidocaryeae
- Genus: Oncocalamus (G. Mann & H. Wendl.)

Species
- Oncocalamus djodu; Oncocalamus macrospathus; Oncocalamus mannii; Oncocalamus tuleyi; Oncocalamus wrightianus

Genus of palms from Africa

Oncocalamus is a monoecious genus of flowering plants in the palm family found in western Africa. The genus is the lone member of the Oncocalaminae; once placed with the vegetatively similar Eremospatha and Laccosperma in the Ancistrophyllinae, it is now isolated based on their unusual flowers and arrangement. Such a placement argues for a long and complex evolutionary process in the Calamoideae with heavy extinction rates. The Greek genus name combines "horn" and "capsule".

== Description ==
The trunks are small, very spiny, and high climbing, becoming bare with age. All species form dense clusters with undivided or bifid juvenile leaves which become pinnate in maturity, with leaf sheath spines, leaflet cirri, and spiny petioles, all adapted for climbing. The leaflets are few to many, with one, two, or more folds, entire, acute, linear or sigmoid, and regularly arranged along the rachis.

As hapaxanths, the inflorescence emerges at the top of the stem, amongst reduced leaves, with male and female flowers, on a once-branched spike. The flowers are arranged in clusters of up to 11, with one or three pistillate and two to four staminate flowers at the center of the cluster. The fruit is spherical and covered in vertical rows of yellow to brown scales with one seed.

== Distribution and habitat ==
Strictly low land rain forest inhabitants, they are found in equatorial west Africa.
