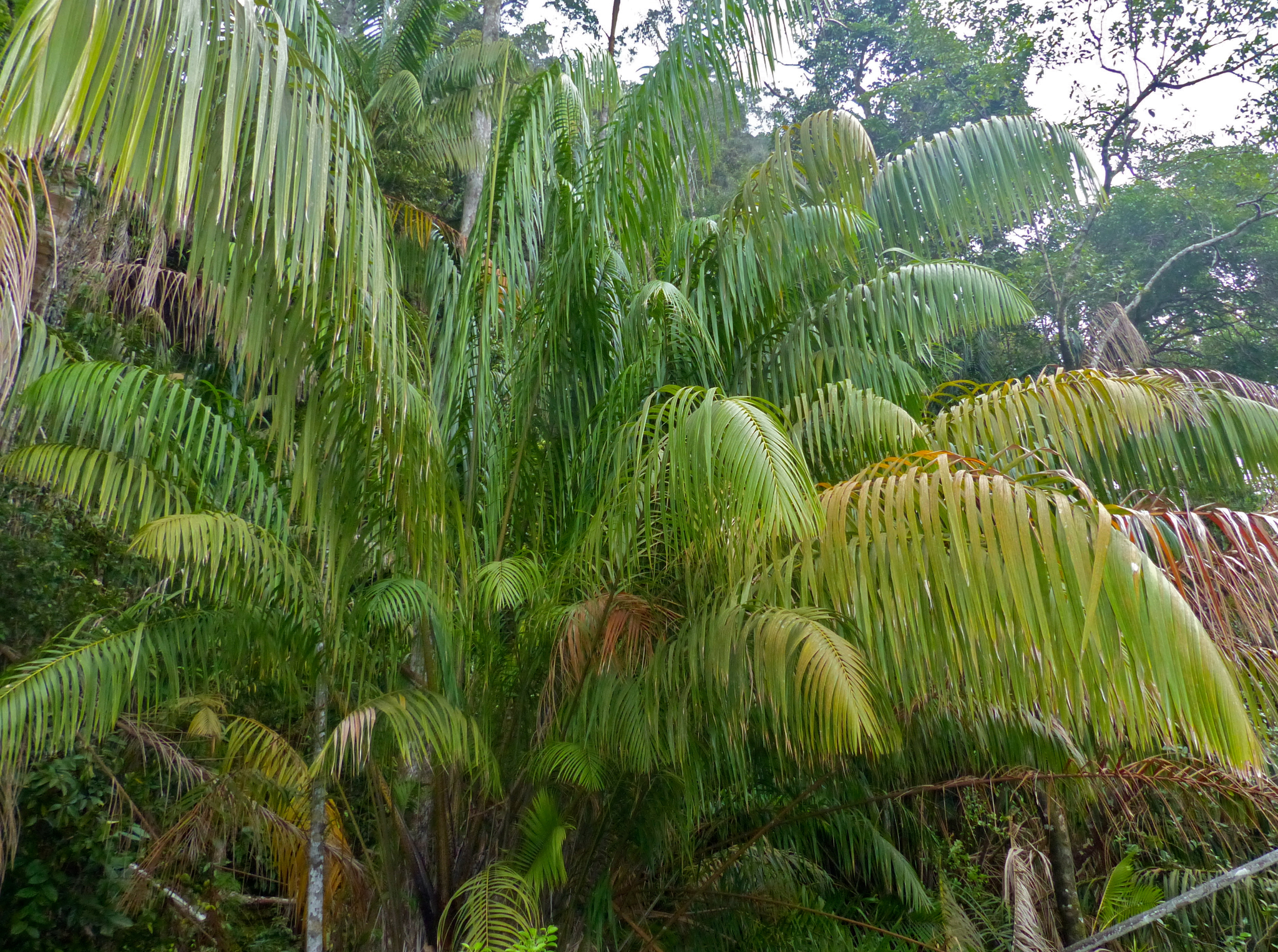
- Eugeissona utilis

Scientific classification
- Kingdom: Plantae
- Clade: Embryophytes
- Clade: Tracheophytes
- Clade: Spermatophytes
- Clade: Angiosperms
- Clade: Monocots
- Clade: Commelinids
- Order: Arecales
- Family: Arecaceae
- Subfamily: Calamoideae
- Tribe: Eugeissoneae
- Genus: Eugeissona; Griff.

Species
- Eugeissona ambigua; Eugeissona brachystachys; Eugeissona insignis; Eugeissona minor; Eugeissona tristis; Eugeissona utilis

= Eugeissona =

Genus of palms from Southeast Asia

Eugeissona is a clustering genus of flowering plant in the palm family native to Borneo, Thailand and Malaysia. The six monoecious species provide a wide range of local uses and are commonly called bertam or wild Bornean sago. The genus is the sole representative of the Eugeissoninae having very few obvious relatives; the hermaphrodite and staminate flowers are also found in Metroxylon, however the other specialized characteristics are unique suggesting an early split and differentiation from other members of the Calameae. Fossilized pollen belonging to these plants has been recovered in the lower and middle Miocene deposits in Sarawak. The name is from two Greek words meaning "good" and "roof", due to their common use in roof thatching.

== Description ==
All of the Eugeissona palms will form above-ground stems where the apical inflorescence will appear toward the final year of the palm life. For the highland natives of Borneo they let the E. utilis palm grow trunk and harvest it just before flowering for its palm heart and the starch (sago) found inside. Amongst the lowland native, the much sought-after palm heart is harvested before the trunk has been formed. During trunk-forming they are supported by tall masses of stilt roots in which detritus and leaf matter collect, providing nesting to various biota. The large leaves are carried on long, spiny petioles, and the rachises and trunks are also spine-bearing. The erect inflorescence bears some of the largest flowers in the palm family, emerging within the leaf crown featuring both male and bisexual flowers. The fruit is a beaked, ovoid drupe carrying one seed.

=== Floral microbiome ===
Eugeissona tristis, from West Malaysia, is adapted to promote microbial growth in its flowers. It bears robust, long-lived (sometimes over 4 months) flowers which contain abundant yeast populations. In the central chambers of these flowers, yeast fermentation generates a nectar that is almost 4% ethanol. The palm is pollinated by mammals (squirrels, nocturnal murids, and treeshews like the pentailed treeshrew) which have adapted to chronic alcohol consumption.

== Distribution and habitat ==
They inhabit a variety of settings including the low-lying heath forests, montane rain forests, and swamps, but are most common on scarp faces, hills and rocky ridgetops up to 1000 m. E. brachystachys and E. tristis are found solely in Malaysia, while the remainder are Bornean or Thai in origin. E. tristis has become an effective pest in the Hill Dipterocarp forest where it colonizes cleared timberland preventing the regeneration of various trees.

== Cultivation and uses ==
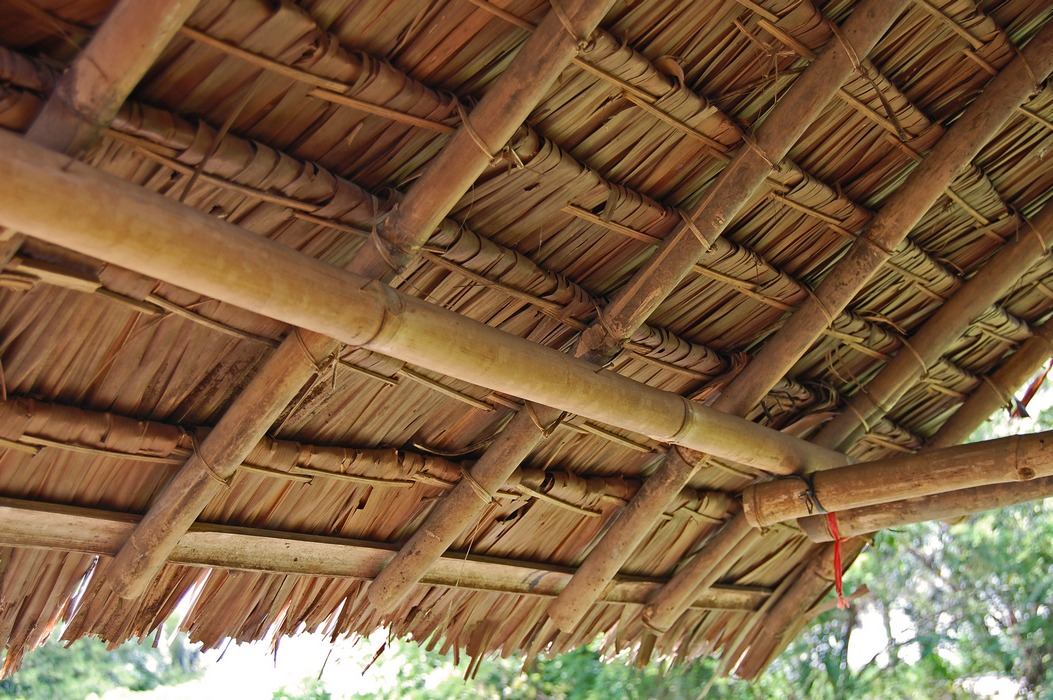
Roof thatched from palm leaves

While not common in cultivation, they are used extensively by locals for a variety of purposes. The sago made from E. utilis trunks forms the staple of the Penan and Punan diet. The seed's endosperm and the pollen are also known to be consumed. The leaves are used in roof construction, various thatchings, and the manufacture of blinds. The stilt roots of some species are made into walking sticks and toys, while the petioles are fashioned into darts for blowgun hunting.
