= Ancistrophyllinae =

Scientific classification
- Kingdom: Plantae
- Clade: Tracheophytes
- Clade: Angiosperms
- Clade: Monocots
- Clade: Commelinids
- Order: Arecales
- Family: Arecaceae
- Subfamily: Calamoideae
- Tribe: Lepidocaryeae
- Subtribe: Ancistrophyllinae; Becc.

Tribe of palms

Ancistrophyllinae is a subtribe of plants in the family Arecaceae found in Africa. Genera in the subtribe are:

- Oncocalamus
- Eremospatha
- Laccosperma

== See also ==
- List of Arecaceae genera
