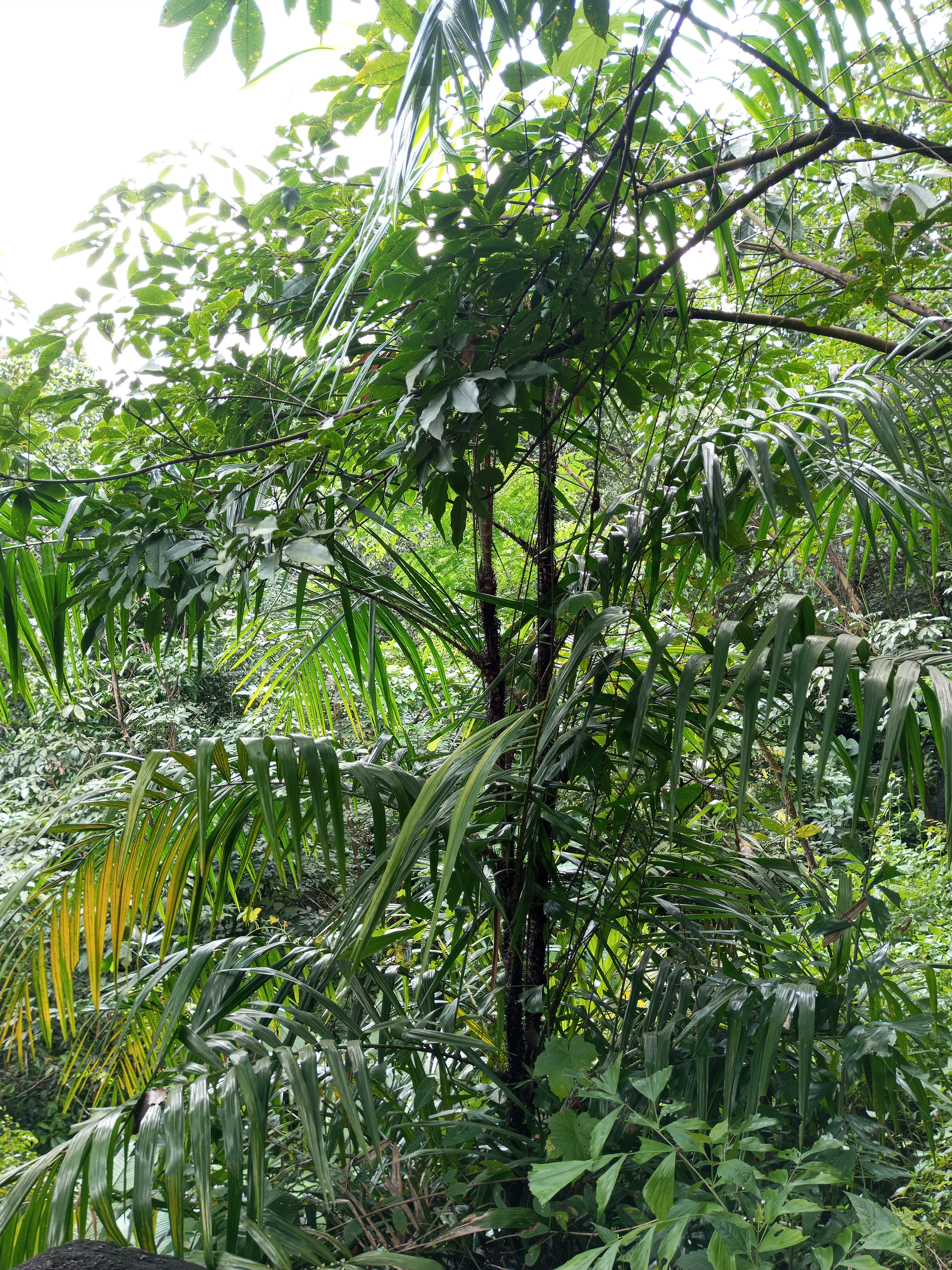

Scientific classification
- Kingdom: Plantae
- Clade: Tracheophytes
- Clade: Angiosperms
- Clade: Monocots
- Clade: Commelinids
- Order: Arecales
- Family: Arecaceae
- Genus: Calamus
- Species: C. thwaitesii

Binomial name
- Calamus thwaitesii Becc.

Synonyms
- Calamus thwaitesii var. canaranus Becc.

= Calamus thwaitesii =

Species of plant

Calamus thwaitesii is a species of rattan palm in the family Arecaceae. It is native to Southwest India and Sri Lanka.

== See also ==
- Climbing palm
