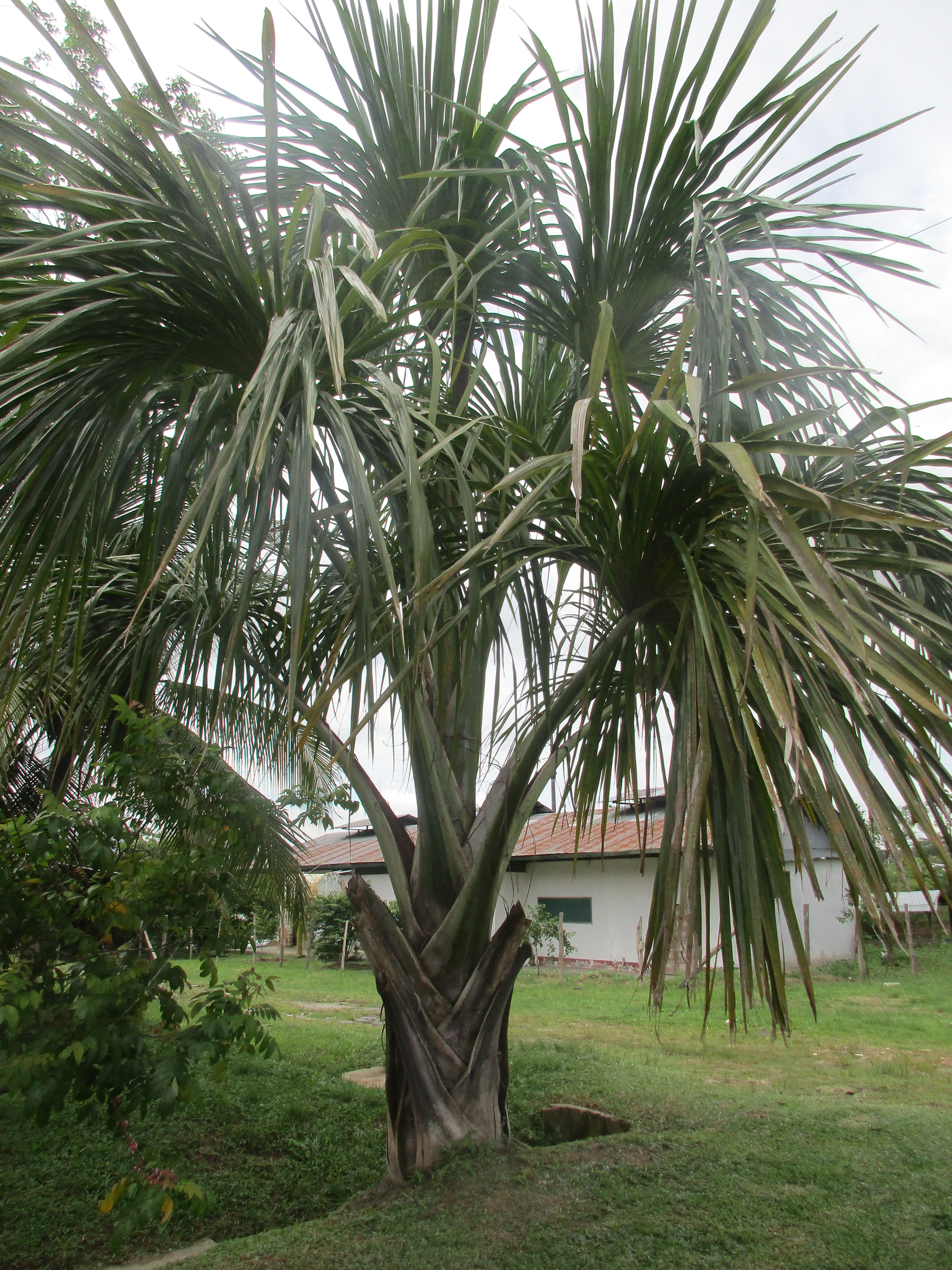

Conservation status
- Conservation Dependent (IUCN 2.3)

Scientific classification
- Kingdom: Plantae
- Clade: Tracheophytes
- Clade: Angiosperms
- Clade: Monocots
- Clade: Commelinids
- Order: Arecales
- Family: Arecaceae
- Genus: Mauritia
- Species: M. carana

Binomial name
- Mauritia carana Wallace

= Mauritia carana =

Species of palm

Mauritia carana is a species of flowering plant in the family Arecaceae. It is found in Brazil, Colombia, Peru, and Venezuela.
