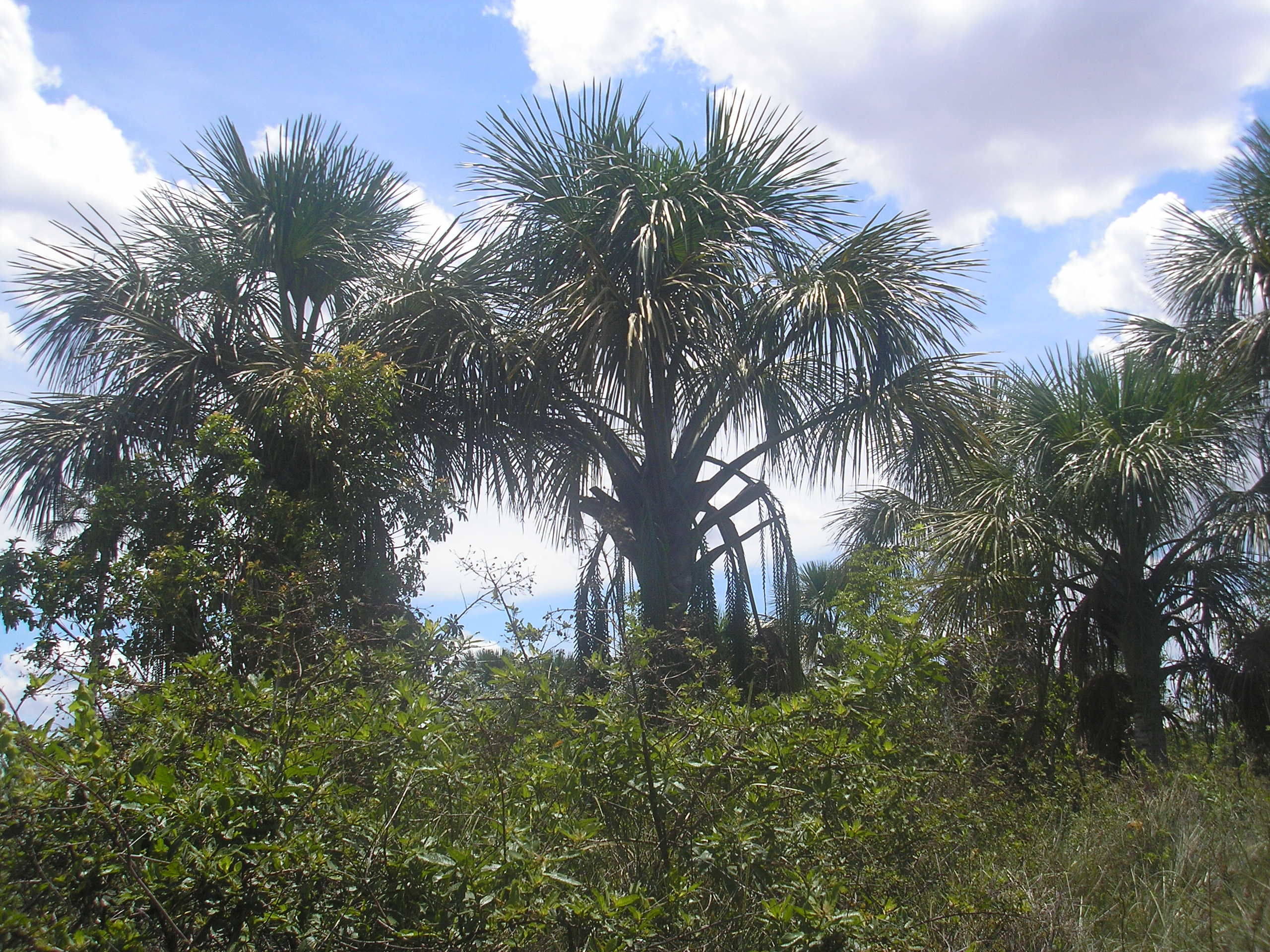
- Mauritia flexuosa captured in Brazil

Scientific classification
- Kingdom: Plantae
- Clade: Tracheophytes
- Clade: Angiosperms
- Clade: Monocots
- Clade: Commelinids
- Order: Arecales
- Family: Arecaceae
- Subfamily: Calamoideae
- Tribe: Lepidocaryeae

= Lepidocaryeae =

Tribe of palms

Lepidocaryeae is a tribe of plants in the family Arecaceae. Subtribes and genera in the tribe are:

- Subtribe Ancistrophyllinae – Africa
  - Oncocalamus – Central Africa
  - Eremospatha – Africa
  - Laccosperma – Africa
- Subtribe Raphiinae
  - Raphia – Africa, Madagascar, parts of South America
- Subtribe Mauritiinae – northern South America
  - Lepidocaryum – central Amazon basin
  - Mauritia – northern South America
  - Mauritiella – northern South America

== See also ==
- List of Arecaceae genera
