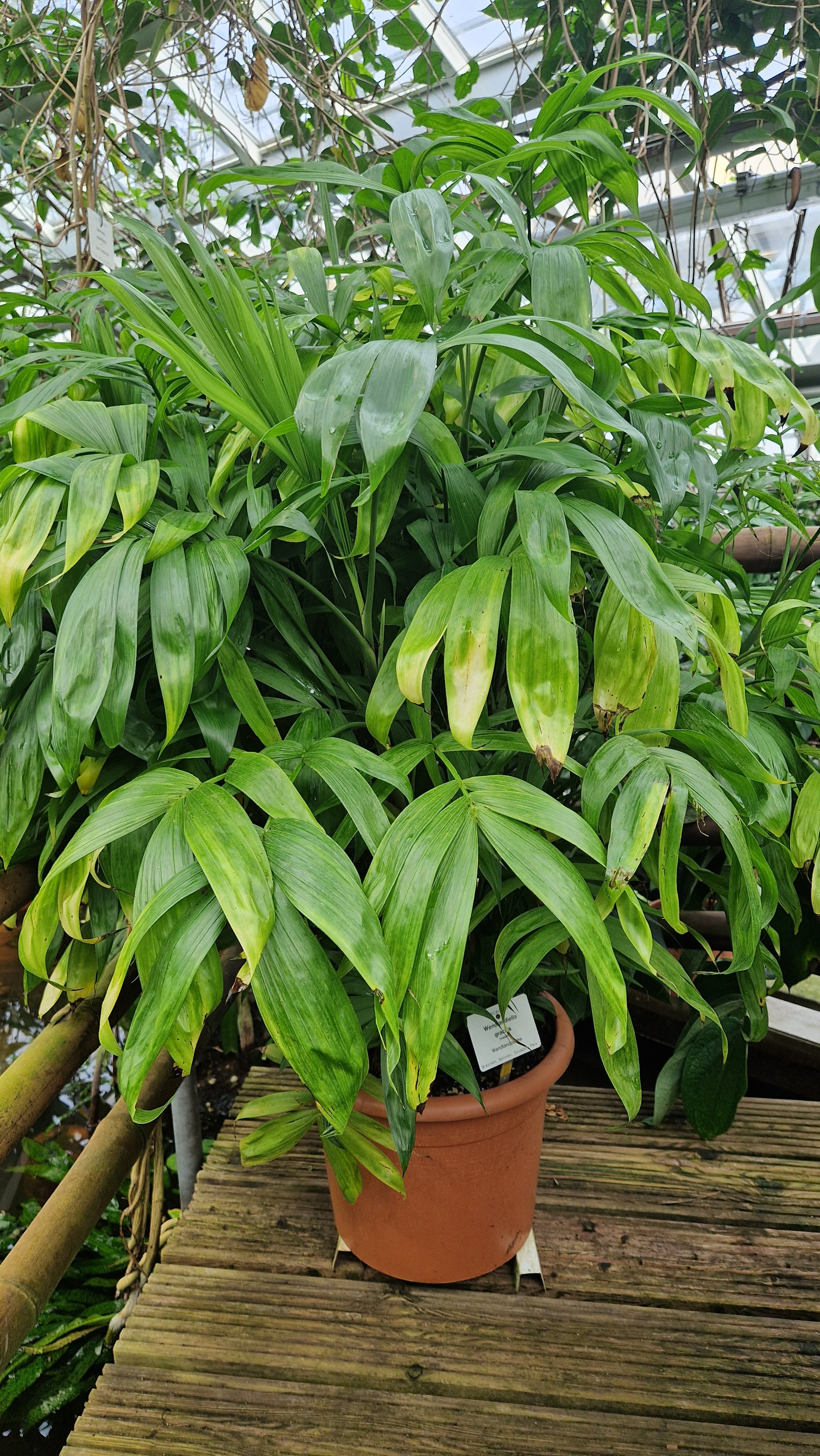

Scientific classification
- Kingdom: Plantae
- Clade: Tracheophytes
- Clade: Angiosperms
- Clade: Monocots
- Clade: Commelinids
- Order: Arecales
- Family: Arecaceae
- Subfamily: Arecoideae
- Tribe: Chamaedoreeae
- Genus: Wendlandiella; Dammer
- Species: W. gracilis

Binomial name
- Wendlandiella gracilis Dammer

Synonyms
- Wendlandiella polyclada Burret; Wendlandiella simplicifrons Burret

= Wendlandiella =

Genus of palms

Wendlandiella is a genus of one species of palms found in Peru, Bolivia and Acre state in Brazil. The genus is named after Hermann Wendland.

The only recognized species is Wendlandiella gracilis. It is dioecious, with male and female flowers on separate individuals. It has three varieties, regarded as distinct species by some authors:

- Wendlandiella gracilis var. gracilis – Acre, northern Peru
- Wendlandiella gracilis var. polyclada (Burret) A.J.Hend. – northern Peru
- Wendlandiella gracilis var. simplicifrons (Burret) A.J.Hend. – Peru, Bolivia
