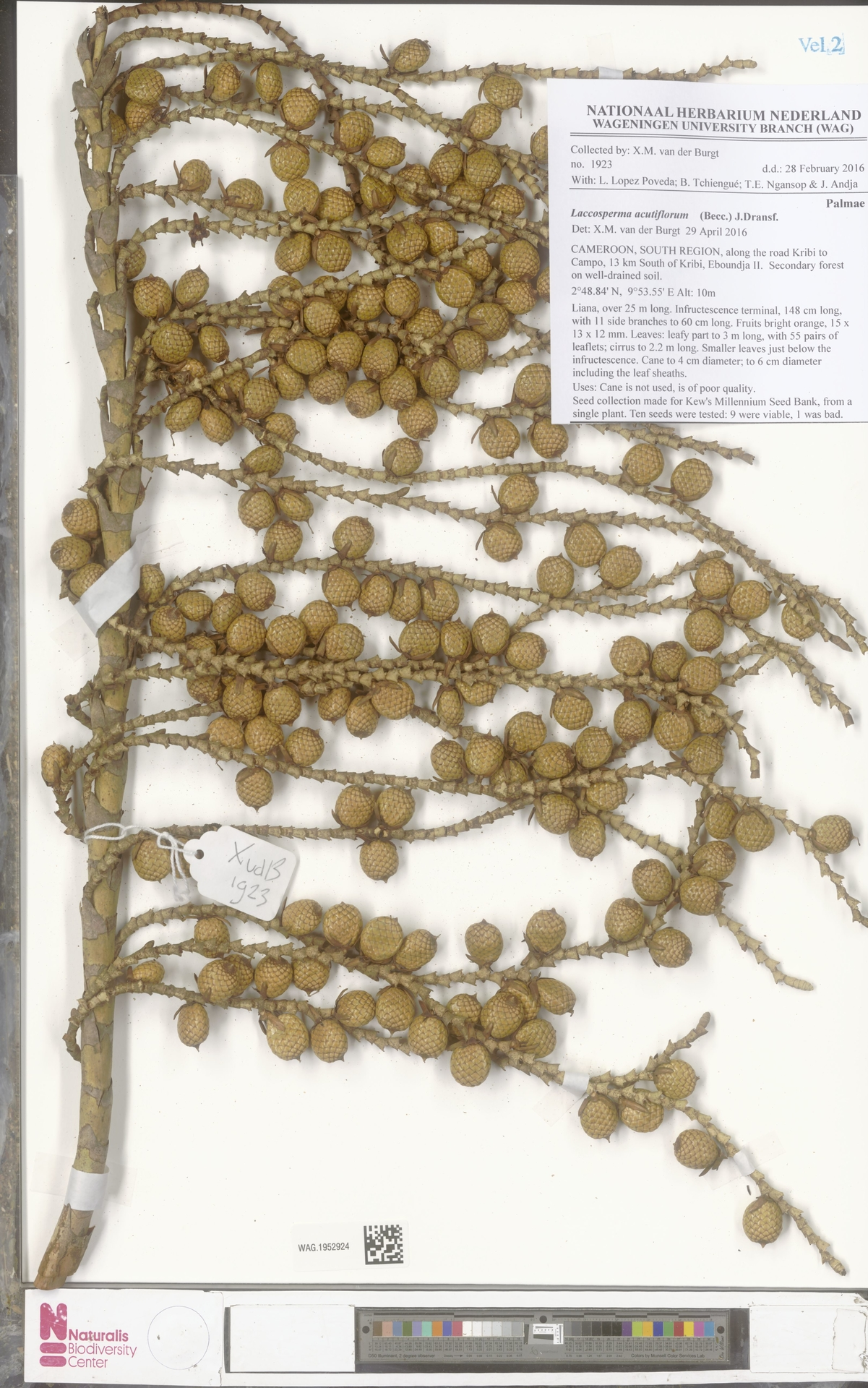
- Laccosperma acutiflorum

Scientific classification
- Kingdom: Plantae
- Clade: Embryophytes
- Clade: Tracheophytes
- Clade: Angiosperms
- Clade: Monocots
- Clade: Commelinids
- Order: Arecales
- Family: Arecaceae
- Subfamily: Calamoideae
- Tribe: Lepidocaryeae
- Subtribe: Ancistrophyllinae
- Genus: Laccosperma (G. Mann & H. Wendl.) Drude

Species
- Laccosperma acutiflorum; Laccosperma korupensis; Laccosperma laeve; Laccosperma opacum; Laccosperma robustum; Laccosperma secundiflorum

= Laccosperma =

Genus of palms from Africa

Laccosperma is a clustering genus of flowering plant in the Palm family (Arecaceae or palmae) found in tropical Africa. Poorly studied and rarely cultivated, they are closely related to the genus Eremospatha and with it form a tribe in the subfamily Calameae characterized by dyads of hermaphrodite flowers. The genus name combines the Greek words for "reservoir" and "seed".

== Description ==
The species are mostly medium to large lianas, clustering, high climbing, to over 30 metres in the case of Laccosperma secundiflorum), and extensively armed with sharp spines. The pinnate leaves are usually large, with spiny petioles, rachises and leaf sheaths. The barbed, linear leaflets are regularly arranged along the rachis and usually hang pendent. The end of the rachis, called a cirrus is modified for climbing, featuring double, recurved spines which hook onto forest vegetation. These are not true tendrils because they do not twine. In some species the ocrea, a thin flange where the leaf meets the stem, is enlarged and harbors ants. (myrmecophily). This is the only other genus of plants beside Raphia which has its fronds in four ranks spiraling clockwise or counter-clockwise along the stem, representing a phyllotaxis of 1/4.

As hapaxanths, after a prolonged vegetative period, a brief flowering phase begins which results in the death of individual stems. They simultaneously produce multiple inflorescences at the top of the trunk, long, once or twice-branched spikes with bisexual flowers. The fruit is small and with neat rows of scales, and contains one seed.

== Distribution and habitat ==
Growing in the tropics of the Congo Basin and west Africa, the Laccosperma palms are found in Cameroon, Ghana, Nigeria, and Gabon. They grow in low rainforest mountains and in swamps where they may be used as a source of cane.
