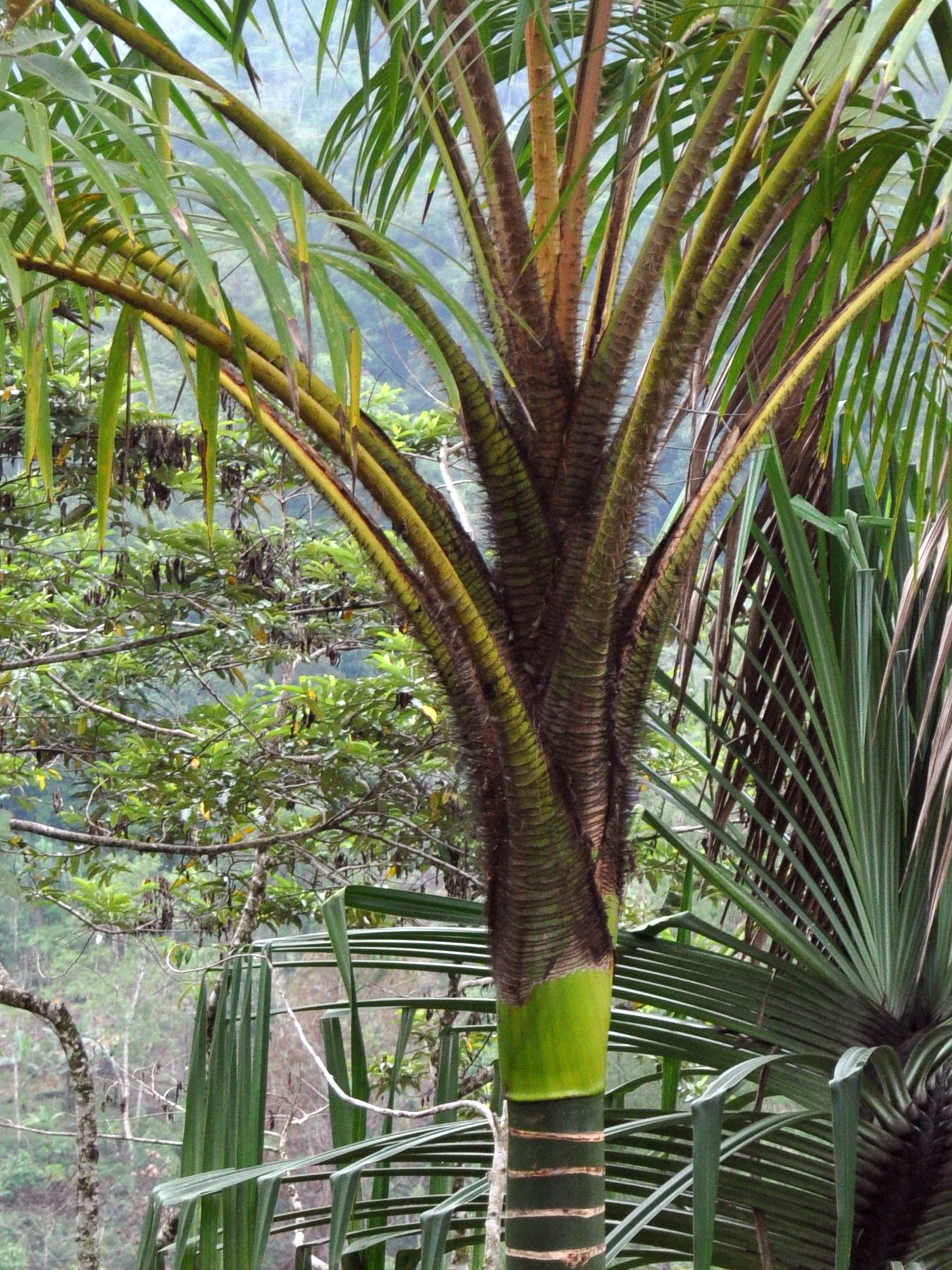

Scientific classification
- Kingdom: Plantae
- Clade: Tracheophytes
- Clade: Angiosperms
- Clade: Monocots
- Clade: Commelinids
- Order: Arecales
- Family: Arecaceae
- Subfamily: Calamoideae
- Tribe: Calameae
- Genus: Pigafetta (Blume) Becc.

Species
- Pigafetta elata (Giseke) Becc.; Pigafetta filaris (Mart.) H.Wendl.

= Pigafetta =

Genus of palms

Pigafetta is a genus of two palm species in the family Arecaceae.

They are native to the Maluku Islands, Sulawesi, and New Guinea where they grow near rivers and in forest clearings up to 900 m in elevation. It is named after Antonio Pigafetta and is sometimes misspelled as Pigafettia. Thought to contain only one species, in 1994 it was found to have two; P. elata and P. filaris, both of which are among the fastest growing palms. Pigafetta elata, planted in Tahiti by palm expert Donald R. Hodel in 1981, had by 1990, grown to 16 m (52 ft) height. Another P. elata, seen growing at the Sibolangit Botanic Garden in Sumatra by botanical explorer David G. Fairchild was 18 m (59 ft) tall, but was only 6.5 years old, averaging 2.7 m (8 ft 10 in) per year.

== Description ==
These dioecious palms have green, solitary trunks with widely spaced leaf scar rings. The trunks grow to 45 cm in diameter and 35 m in height; the leaf crown is hemispherical, or nearly so, with 6 m pinnate leaves on robust, 2 m petioles. Petioles are armed with 6 cm spines, gold or gray in color. Inflorescences emerge from within the leaf crown, to 2 m in length, and resemble those in Mauritia. The fruit ripens to a yellow-orange drupe, covered in scales and containing one seed.
