= Truongsonia =

Scientific classification
- Kingdom: Plantae
- Clade: Tracheophytes
- Clade: Angiosperms
- Clade: Monocots
- Clade: Commelinids
- Order: Arecales
- Family: Arecaceae
- Genus: Truongsonia; A.J.Hend., N.S.Lý, W.J.Baker, S.Bellot, J.Dransf. & Eiserhar
- Species: T. lecongkietii

Binomial name
- Truongsonia lecongkietii N.S.Lý, W.J.Baker & A.J.Hend.

Genus of palms

Truongsonia is a genus of palms. It includes a single species, Truongsonia lecongkietii, which is endemic to Vietnam.

It is a small palm known only from a small area of Quảng Ngãi province in central Vietnam. It grows in forest understorey on steep slopes near streams in primary evergreen broadleaf forest at about 1000 meters elevation.
