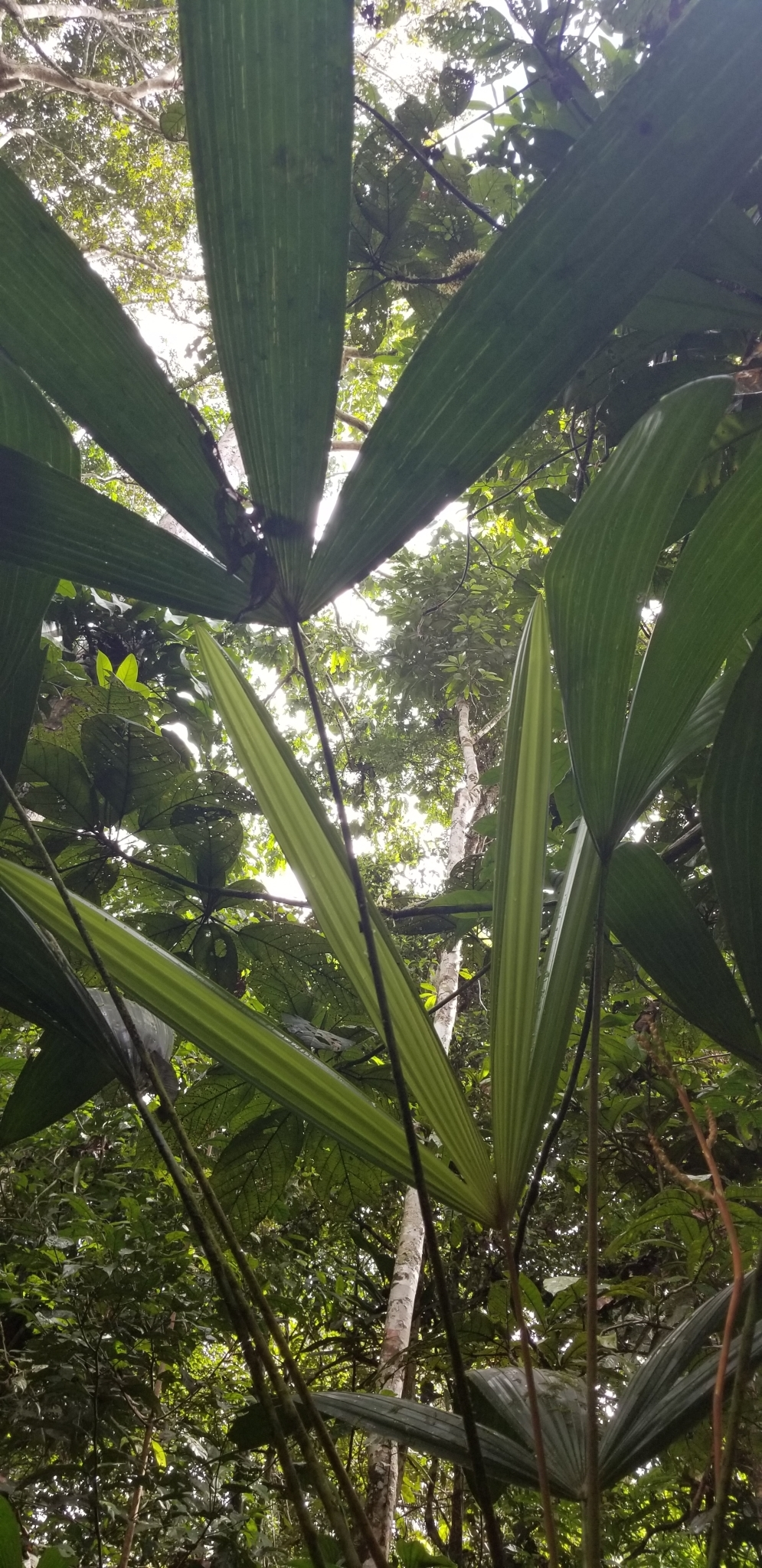

Scientific classification
- Kingdom: Plantae
- Clade: Tracheophytes
- Clade: Angiosperms
- Clade: Monocots
- Clade: Commelinids
- Order: Arecales
- Family: Arecaceae
- Subfamily: Calamoideae
- Tribe: Lepidocaryeae
- Genus: Lepidocaryum; Mart.
- Species: L. tenue

Binomial name
- Lepidocaryum tenue Mart.

Synonyms
- Mauritia tenuis (Mart.) Spruce; Mauritia casiquiarensis Spruce; Lepidocaryum casiquiarense (Spruce) Drude; Mauritia guainiensis Spruce; Lepidocaryum guainiense (Spruce) Drude; Lepidocaryum gujanense Becc.; Lepidocaryum gracile Mart.; Mauritia gracilis (Mart.) Spruce; Lepidocaryum enneaphyllum Barb.Rodr.; Lepidocaryum sexpartitum Trail & Barb.Rodr.; Lepidocaryum macrocarpum (Drude) Becc.; Mauritia quadripartita Spruce; Lepidocaryum quadripartitum (Spruce) Drude; Lepidocaryum tessmannii Burret; Lepidocaryum allenii Dugand

= Lepidocaryum =

Genus of palms

Lepidocaryum is a monotypic genus of flowering plant in the palm family from South America where the lone species, Lepidocaryum tenue, is commonly called poktamui. Nine species names have been published, but palm taxonomists currently agree that just one variable species includes them all. The most reduced member of the Lepidocaryeae, it is similar in appearance to two closely related genera, Mauritia and Mauritiella, as well as to the former genus Lytocaryum (now included in Syagrus). The genus name combines the Greek words for "scale" and "nut" and the species epithet is Latin for "thin".

== Description ==
At just 2.5 cm in width, the clustering trunks reach no higher than 3.5 m and are covered at the top by old, adherent leaf bases. The small, reduplicate leaves are palmate and borne on 60 cm petioles. Each leaf is split in half, to the petiole, with each half further divided into 2–11 narrow segments.

Lepidocaryum is dioecious, with male and female flowers on separate plants, both with interfoliar inflorescences, branched to two orders, which are superficially similar. Female plants produce oblong or ovoid fruit, usually with one seed, red to brown in color and covered in scales.

== Distribution and habitat ==
Spread throughout Brazil's Amazon region, north to Venezuela, the wetter parts of Colombia, Guyana and Peru, it is an undergrowth palm found in low land rain forest. In habitat the leaves are often used in thatch.

== Varieties ==
Three varieties are recognized:

- Lepidocaryum tenue var. casiquiarense (Spruce) A.J.Hend. - Venezuela, Colombia, Brazil
- Lepidocaryum tenue var. gracile (Mart.) A.J.Hend. - Guyana, northern Brazil
- Lepidocaryum tenue var. tenue - Colombia, Peru, northern Brazil

== Uses ==
In the Amazonian region of Peru, particularly in and around Iquitos, the palm's leaves are widely used for thatching roofs.
