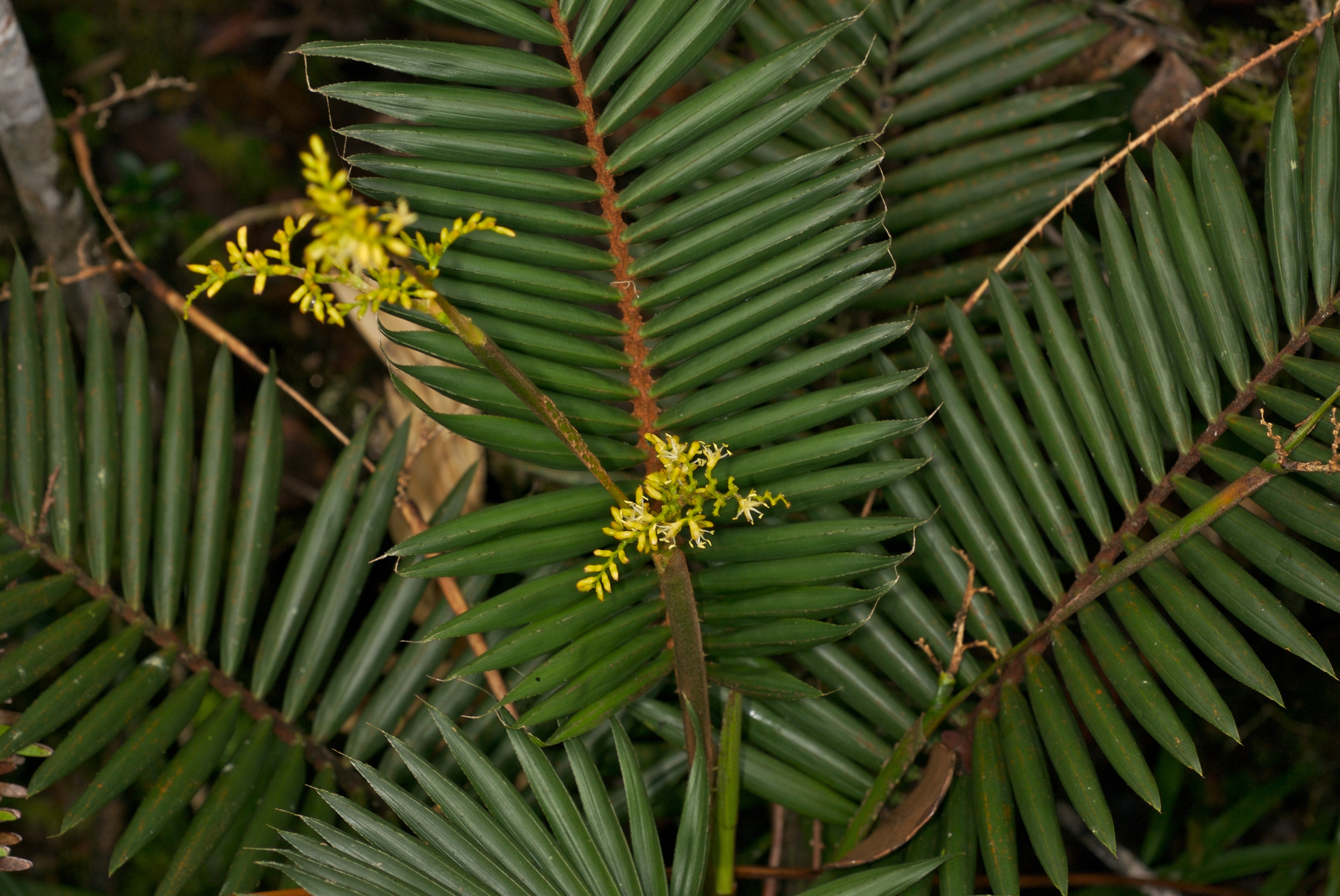
- Calamus gibbsianus.

Scientific classification
- Kingdom: Plantae
- Clade: Tracheophytes
- Clade: Angiosperms
- Clade: Monocots
- Clade: Commelinids
- Order: Arecales
- Family: Arecaceae
- Subfamily: Calamoideae; Griff.

3 tribes
- Calameae; Lepidocaryeae; Eugeissoneae
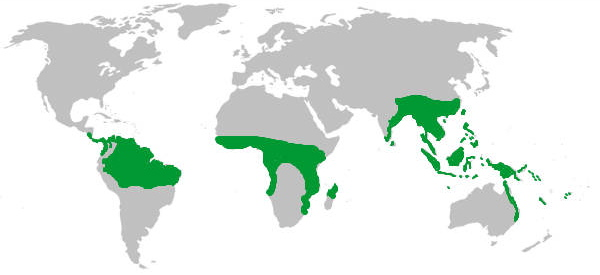

= Calamoideae =

Subfamily of palms

Calamoideae is a subfamily of flowering plant in the palm family found throughout Central America, South America, Africa, India, China, Southeast Asia and Australia. It is represented by 21 genera - containing nearly a quarter of all species in the palm family - including the largest genus, Calamus, the type genus of the group. Only four are found in the New World while the rest are Old World denizens, usually found in equatorial swampland or along tropical coastlines.

While the many species show marked differences, the bracts of all orders are tubular, the flowers are almost always borne in dyads or dyad derivatives, but most marked as an identifier among these palms are the overlapping scales covering the fruit; occasionally small and irregular they are, in most cases, neatly aligned in vertical rows. Also common to the group are varying forms of armament: spines along leaf margins or on sheaths, root and stem spines, reflexed rachis cirri, or specialized hooks among the climbing species.

The long fossil record and the many unspecialized features imply the group diverged early, parallel perhaps, with the Coryphoideae from an ancient protopalm ancestor. While the simplest floral characteristics belong to those rattan genera endemic to Africa (Laccosperma, Eremospatha and Oncocalamus), they exhibit tremendous diversity suggesting a larger representation in the past. This subfamily has been noted in palm literature as the Lepidocaryoideae, however an 1844 (Griffith) designation of Calamoideae predates the use of the former at this rank and, as such, is correct in botanical nomenclature.

== Description ==
The Calamoideae is a widely varied group. Many of the rattans in the subfamily are slender, high-climbing vines creeping from the jungle floor aided by evolved hooks and barbs, allowing them to cling onto competitive vegetation to reach the canopy top. Whether or not they climb, almost all genera in this subfamily tend to have clustering species with few solitary members among them, though some genre are mostly or strictly solitary producing acaulescent trees. Among the prostrate, clustered, or solitary and erect members, the Korthalsia genus is unique in that it produces off-shoots high above ground rather than near-ground as is seen in most other clustering species.

The leaves are consistently reduplicate of which palmate and pinnate variations exist. The armament on the leaves in many species mimics the armament found on other parts of plants in the group. Sharp prickles and spines line rachises, leaf margins and leaf sheaths. Other genera produce spines along the roots and stems. In climbing plants there are extended rachises formed into sharp spines while, as in the African rattans, the distal most leaflets are modified into reflexed spines, acanthophylls. While some Calamus species bear protective cirri others have evolved spines on false inflorescences as a means of protection.

Sexually they show hermaphroditic, monoecious, dioecious and polygamous characteristics of which some are hapaxanthic, dying after they flower and fruit, while the remainder follow the more common pleonanthic reproductive behavior, continuing growth after flowering. A bract is characteristic in this subfamily, protecting the dyads of flowers on maturing and where dyads are not present a dyadic origin of flowering is evident (with the exception of Oncocalamus). Triads of hermaphroditic flowers are occasionally discovered within Laccosperma and a sterile staminate flower winged by two pistillate flowers are found in the rare Calamus species though these are exceptions to the rule. Pollinated flowers produce a fruit with overlapping scales. Usually arranged in distinct, vertical rows, the scales in Eugeissona, Myrialepis and a handful of Salacca species are small and irregularly arranged.

== Distribution ==
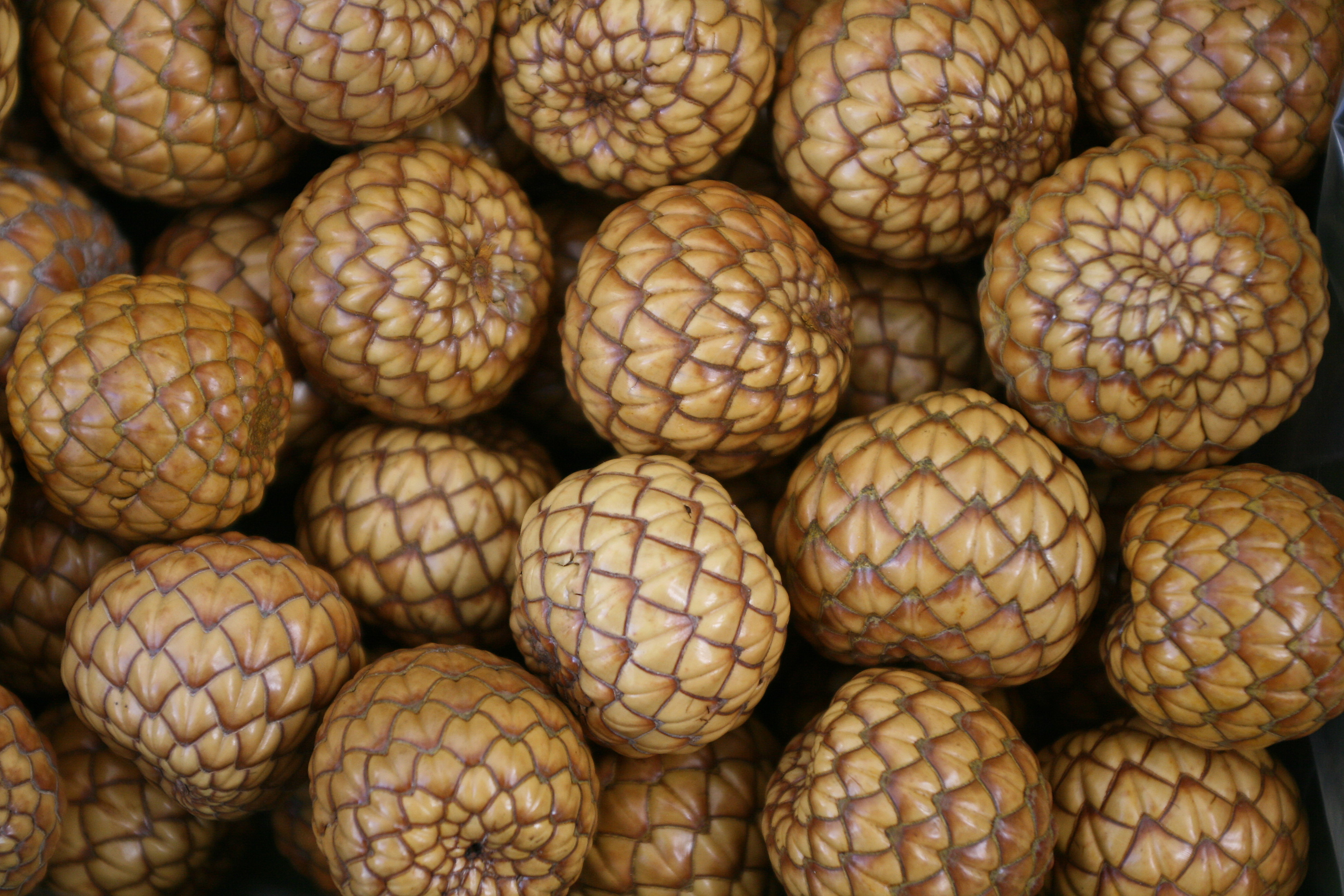
Fruit of Calamus sp.

The lone outlier in the subfamily, Raphia taedigera, exists in tropical America though some speculation suggests it may have been introduced. In any case, it is joined by the strictly New World genera Mauritia, Mauritiella, and Lepidocaryum in Trinidad, Brazil, Venezuela, Peru, Colombia, Ecuador, French Guiana and Suriname. Absent from the Andes, these plants are found in wet, predominantly lowland stands with some common to black-water river banks.

In Africa they are plentiful south of the Sahara, reaching from the West across humid rain forest and the Congo Basin, through the central part of the continent with southern bands hugging the coast down through Angola to the west and Mozambique to the east; one species in the Raphia genus occupies areas across the northern part of Madagascar, another possible introduction.

Onto Sri Lanka, India, China, the Fiji and Indonesian island chains and Australia, members of this subfamily are widely dispersed across East and West Asia and the southern Pacific.

== Tribes ==
=== Calameae ===
Calameae is an Old World tribe. Among all the genera there are plants with pinnate, entire, or bifid leaves with pinnate-ribs. Extremely varied, they are divided into subtribes based on the progressive modifications of flower arrangements from hermaphroditic dyads, dyads with hermaphrodites alongside staminate flowers, pistillate and sterile staminate pairs, onto solitary staminate or pistillate units.

- Subtribe Korthalsiinae
  - Korthalsia – Malesia, New Guinea, Indochina
- Subtribe Salaccinae – Malesia, Indochina
  - Eleiodoxa – Malay Peninsula, Sumatra, Borneo; monotypic genus
  - Salacca – Malesia, Indochina
- Subtribe Metroxylinae
  - Metroxylon – New Guinea, Melanesia
- Subtribe Pigafettinae
  - Pigafetta – Sulawesi, Moluccas and New Guinea
- Subtribe Plectocomiinae – Malesia, Indochina
  - Plectocomia – Malesia, Indochina
  - Myrialepis – Malesia, Malay Peninsula, Sumatra; monotypic genus
  - Plectocomiopsis – Malesia, Indochina
- Subtribe Calaminae – Africa, Asia
  - Calamus – Africa, Asia

Obsolete genera (all species are now included within the genus Calamus):

- Calospatha
- Ceratolobus – Malay Peninsula, Sumatra, Borneo
- Daemonorops – Malesia, Indochina
- Pogonotium – northern Borneo
- Retispatha

=== Lepidocaryeae ===
A tribe with three subtribes from Africa, North and Central America with moderately sized, erect trunks, with crownshafts. The flowers are solitary, spirally-arranged, hermaphroditic, and borne in the axils of small bracts. Oncocalamus possesses a flower structure unique not just to the tribe but to the family as a whole. It is vegetatively similar to another subtribe within Calameae but is distinguished by the pistillate and staminate flowers formed in groups up to 11. These flower clusters and isolated position of the genus argues for a long history of this subfamily in Africa with much extinction.

- Subtribe Ancistrophyllinae – Africa
  - Oncocalamus – Central Africa
  - Eremospatha – Africa
  - Laccosperma – Africa
- Subtribe Raphiinae
  - Raphia – Africa, Madagascar, parts of South America
- Subtribe Mauritiinae – northern South America
  - Lepidocaryum – central Amazon basin
  - Mauritia – northern South America
  - Mauritiella – northern South America

=== Eugeissoneae ===
A monotypic tribe from Southeast Asia with only one genus

- Eugeissona – Borneo, Malay Peninsula
