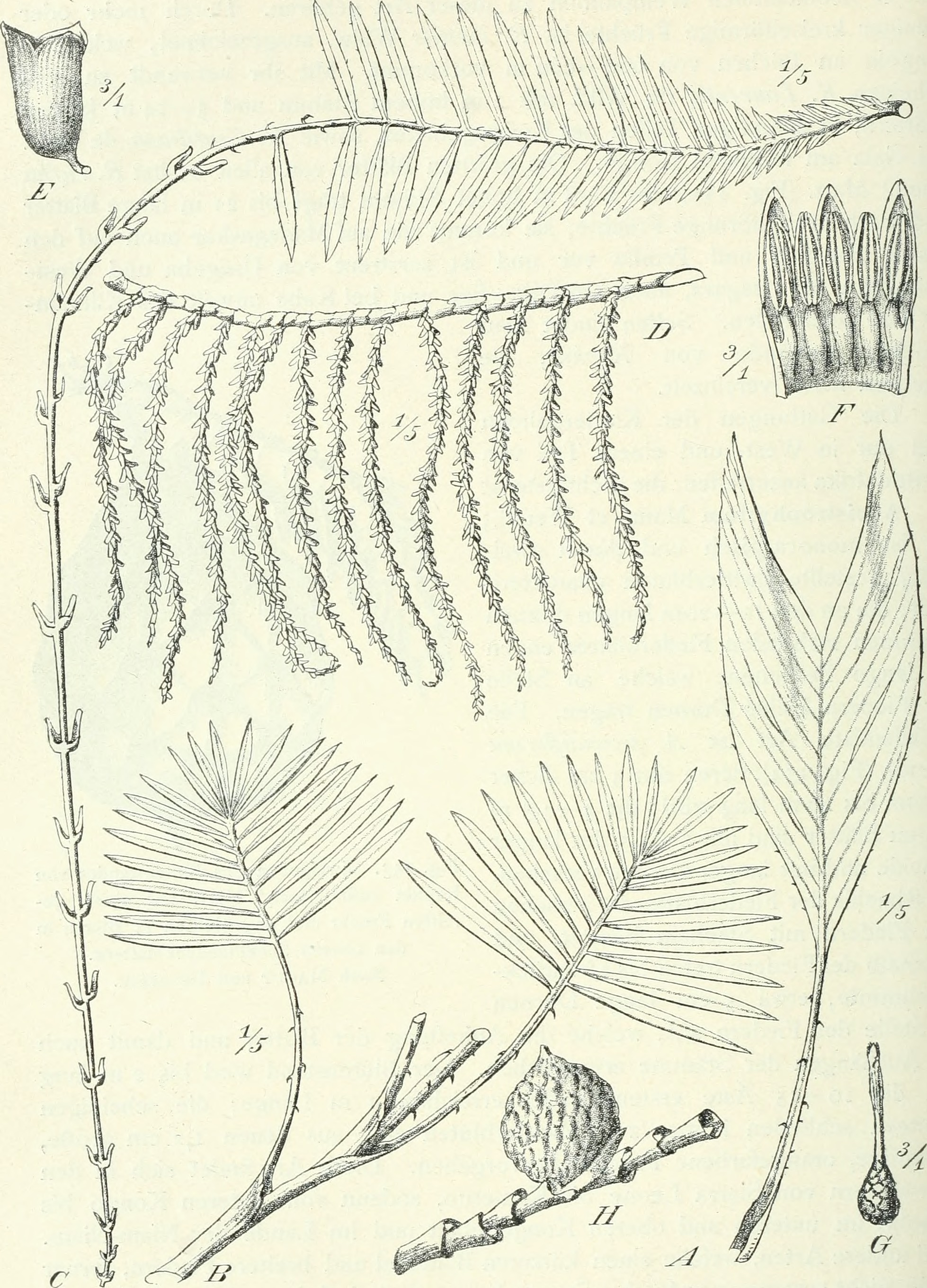

Scientific classification
- Kingdom: Plantae
- Clade: Tracheophytes
- Clade: Angiosperms
- Clade: Monocots
- Clade: Commelinids
- Order: Arecales
- Family: Arecaceae
- Genus: Laccosperma
- Species: L. secundiflorum

Binomial name
- Laccosperma secundiflorum (P.Beauv.) Kuntze

Synonyms
- Ancistrophyllum secundiflorum (P.Beauv.) G.Mann & H.Wendl.

= Laccosperma secundiflorum =

Species of palm

Laccosperma secundiflorum, the gao, is a species of rattan palm found in the Dzangha-Sangha tropical forests of Cameroon and elsewhere in West Africa. It has thorny stems, which it uses to wrap around nearby trees, enabling it to grow to heights of over 30 metres. The local population harvests the trees, and uses them to make palm oil and palm wine, as well as canes (similar to rattan) for furniture, mats and baskets.
