= Plectocomiopsis =

Scientific classification
- Kingdom: Plantae
- Clade: Tracheophytes
- Clade: Angiosperms
- Clade: Monocots
- Clade: Commelinids
- Order: Arecales
- Family: Arecaceae
- Subfamily: Calamoideae
- Tribe: Calameae
- Genus: Plectocomiopsis; Becc.

Species
- Plectocomiopsis corneri Furtado; Plectocomiopsis geminiflora (Griff.) Becc.; Plectocomiopsis mira J.Dransf.; Plectocomiopsis songthanhensis A.J.Hend. & N.Q.Dung; Plectocomiopsis triquetra (Becc.) J.Dransf.; Plectocomiopsis wrayi Becc.

Genus of palms

Plectocomiopsis is a dioecious genus of flowering plant in the palm family found in Indochina, Malaysia, Borneo and Sumatra. Hapaxanthic and armed with spines, they are a climbing rattan, closely related to the Myrialepis palms. The name is Greek for "similar to Plectocomia", another close relative.

== Description ==
The stems are small, densely clustering, spiny, and high climbing with long internodes and conspicuous scars. Young leaves are undivided or with few segments, in maturity becoming pinnate and cirrate with a tubular, unarmed or sparsely armed, scaly leaf sheath. Ocreas present, entire or becoming tattered. The petiole, when present, and the proximal end of the rachis are deeply channeled and spiny; the cirrus and distal end of the rachis are armed with regularly arranged reflexed climbing spines. The single fold, lanceolate leaflets may be few to numerous, usually with armed margins and caducous scales, with conspicuous midribs and transverse veinlets.

The inflorescence is produced at the top of the stem amongst the most distal, often reduced leaves, axis adnate to the internode and emerging from the leaf sheath mouth. The peduncle is short, the prophyll is tubular and two-keeled, peduncular bracts usually absent, and the rachis is much longer than the peduncle. The rachis bracts are tubular and more or less distichous, each subtending a horizontal or pendulous first order branch which features basal, tubular bracts with triangular limbs carrying monopodial flower clusters. In P. corneri the inflorescence is branched to three orders instead of two, with flowers borne on the axes of all orders.

The male flowers are arranged in clusters of up to 32, each flower held in a cuplike rachilla bract with a two-keeled bracteole. The calyx is thick, leathery and tubular, with three lobes, and abaxially covered in scaly trichomes; the corolla is similar, with two distal splits forming three triangle shaped lobes, also bearing scales. The six stamens are laterally fused forming a tube which is tipped by six free, reflexed filaments with short, oblong anthers. The pollen is disulcate and elliptic with tectate exine; pistillode minute.

Female flowers are usually borne in clusters of two to four but may be solitary, and, like the male's, are carried in cuplike bracts with two-keeled bracteoles, with the occasional barely developed second bracteole. The calyx is also thick and leathery, thrice lobed and scaly, usually persistent into fruit; corolla leathery, scaly, with three lobes. The staminodial ring bears six short lobes and sagging, empty anthers; gynoecium egg-shaped to cylindrical, the apical stigmas becoming scaly nearing antithesis. Three incomplete locules are present, each bearing one antropous, basally attached ovule. The fruit has one, rarely two seeds, covered in persistent perianth whorls, and stigmatic apical remains. The epicarp is matted in irregular vertical rows of reflexed scales, with a thin mesocarp and an undifferentiated endocarp. The seed is basally attached, spherical, usually depressed, with a thick sarcoesta, a homogeneous endosperm and a basal embryo.

== Distribution and habitat ==
Plectocomiopsis triquetra and P. wrayi are low land peat swamp forest inhabitants, the former in Borneo, the latter in Malaysia. P. corneri and P. mira are Dipterocarp forest dwellers to 700 m, and P. geminiflora is distributed through a variety of tropical forest types to 1200 m.

== Cultivation and uses ==
The Plectocomiopsis species are not usually cultivated, being extremely spiny and requiring particular tropical conditions. In their natural range they are used in basketry, however their fragile nature prevents them from being a common rattan source. The palm heart of P. geminiflora, despite its bitter taste, is regarded as a delicacy in Borneo; villagers regard some of the others as edible and some as poisonous.
