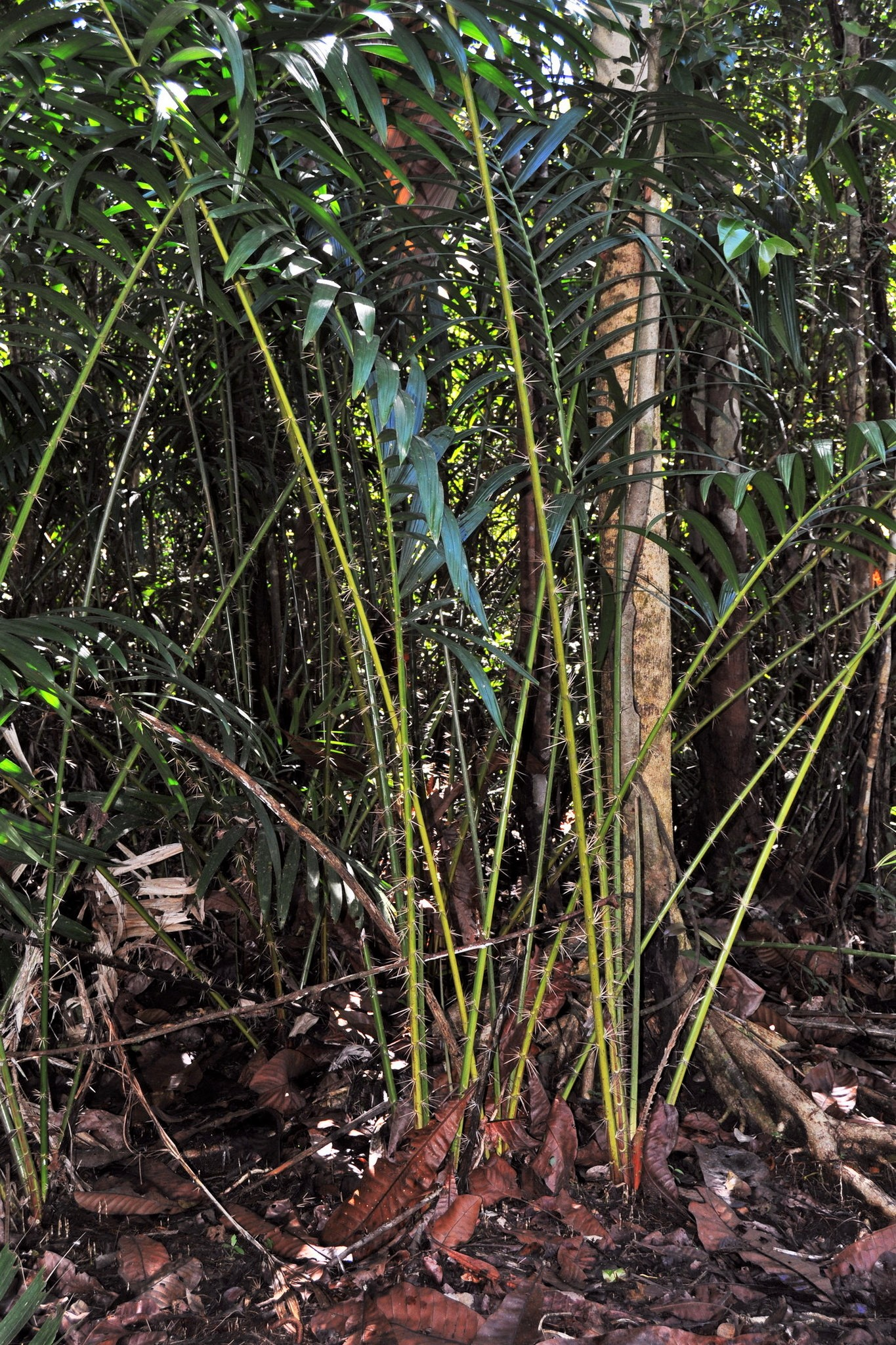

Scientific classification
- Kingdom: Plantae
- Clade: Tracheophytes
- Clade: Angiosperms
- Clade: Monocots
- Clade: Commelinids
- Order: Arecales
- Family: Arecaceae
- Subfamily: Calamoideae
- Tribe: Calameae
- Genus: Eleiodoxa (Becc.) Burret
- Species: E. conferta

Binomial name
- Eleiodoxa conferta (Griff.) Burret

Synonyms
- Salacca conferta Griff.; Salacca scortechinii Becc.; Eleiodoxa microcarpa Burret; Eleiodoxa orthoschista Burret; Eleiodoxa scortechinii (Becc.) Burret; Eleiodoxa xantholepis Burret

= Eleiodoxa =

Genus of palms

Eleiodoxa is a monotypic genus of flowering plant in the palm family found in Southeast Asia. The only species, Eleiodoxa conferta, is a dioecious, swamp-dwelling plant, commonly called by Malay as asam kelubi or asam paya. While five species names have been published, the other four are usually recognized as synonyms of the lectotype E. conferta. The genus is named from two Greek words meaning "water" and "glory" and the species name is Latin for "congested", an allusion to the flower spike.

== Description ==
While remaining underground, the trunks of these palms are clustering and form dense thickets. As one of the few hapaxanths in the family, individual trunks are determinate and die after flowering. A mature leaf reaches 3.5 m in length on 3 m petioles which are armed with whorls of 5 – 7 cm long spines. The green to deep green pinnae are regularly arranged along the rachis, 1.5 m in length, and toothed along the margins. The inflorescence emerges at ground level, bearing either male or female flowers, in the latter forming scaly, red fruit with one or occasionally two seeds.

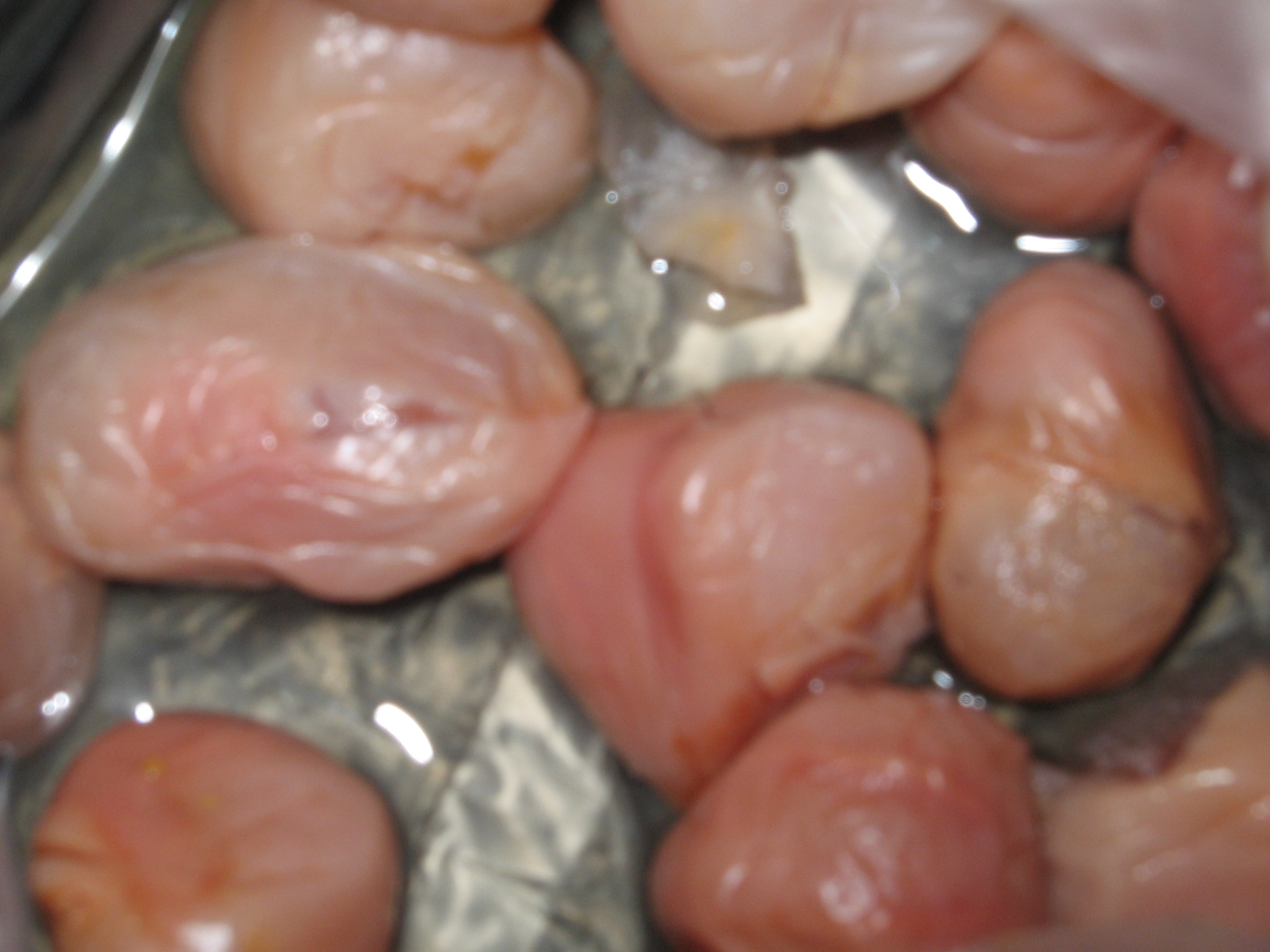
flesh

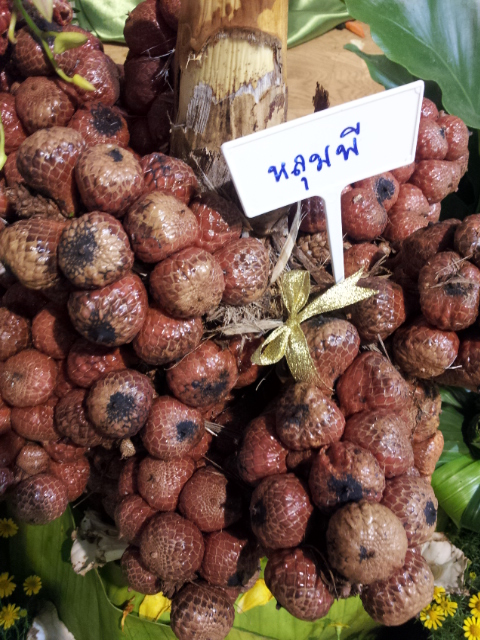
Fruit

== Distribution and habitat ==
Found in tropical Thailand, Malaysia, Borneo and Sumatra in peat swamp forest facies and fresh water swamps they are highly gregarious, forming large colonies.

== Cultivation and uses ==
When this palm is cultivated it demands generous water, and rich, acidic soil and shade or filtered light. In habitat, the palm heart is consumed and the leaves are used in thatching. The fruit are often pickled and used as a substitute for tamarind or made into sweetmeat.
