= Eremospatha =

Scientific classification
- Kingdom: Plantae
- Clade: Tracheophytes
- Clade: Angiosperms
- Clade: Monocots
- Clade: Commelinids
- Order: Arecales
- Family: Arecaceae
- Subfamily: Calamoideae
- Tribe: Lepidocaryeae
- Subtribe: Ancistrophyllinae
- Genus: Eremospatha (G. Mann & H. Wendl.) H. Wendl.

Genus of palms from Africa

Eremospatha is a genus of climbing flowering plants in the palm family found in tropical Africa. These rattans are uncommon in cultivation and poorly understood by taxonomists. Closely related to Laccosperma, they are differentiated by the near complete absence of bracts and bracteoles. The name is from Greek meaning 'without a spathe'.

== Description ==
The slender, high-climbing trunks are naturally clustering and can reach up to 45 m (148 ft) in length. The pinnate leaves range from 30 cm (12 in) to 2.5 m (8 ft 2 in) on short, armed petioles; the rachis, leaf margins and cirri are also armed with spines. They are hermaphroditic, with both male and female reproductive organs present in each flower. The pale blooms are fragrant and produce a red to brown, scaly fruit, each containing one to three seeds.

== Distribution and habitat ==
These palms are native to the rain forest of west Africa, the Congo Basin, and to Tanzania where they grow in swamps and alongside rivers.

== Species ==
Accepted species:

- Eremospatha barendii Sunderl. - Cameroon
- Eremospatha cabrae (De Wild. & T.Durand) De Wild. - Zaire, Congo-Brazzaville, Cabinda, Gabon, Central African Republic
- Eremospatha cuspidata (G.Mann & H.Wendl.) H.Wendl. - Zaire, Congo-Brazzaville, Cabinda, Equatorial Guinea, Gabon, Central African Republic, Angola, Zambia
- Eremospatha dransfieldii Sunderl. - Sierra Leone, Ivory Coast, Ghana
- Eremospatha haullevilleana De Wild. - Cameroon, Zaire, Congo-Brazzaville, Cabinda, Gabon, Central African Republic, Burundi, Uganda, Tanzania
- Eremospatha hookeri (G.Mann & H.Wendl.) H.Wendl. - Nigeria, Cameroon, Congo-Brazzaville, Gabon, Central African Republic, Equatorial Guinea
- Eremospatha laurentii De Wild. - Liberia, Sierra Leone, Nigeria, Cameroon, Zaire, Congo-Brazzaville, Gabon, Central African Republic, Equatorial Guinea
- Eremospatha macrocarpa Schaedtler - Cameroon, Gabon, Central African Republic, Equatorial Guinea, Benin, Ghana, Guinea, Ivory Coast, Liberia, Nigeria, Sierra Leone
- Eremospatha quinquecostulata Becc. - Nigeria, Cameroon
- Eremospatha tessmanniana Becc. - Cameroon, Equatorial Guinea
- Eremospatha wendlandiana Dammer ex Becc. - Nigeria, Cameroon, Congo-Brazzaville, Gabon, Central African Republic, Equatorial Guinea, Cabinda
