= Gustav Mann =

German botanist

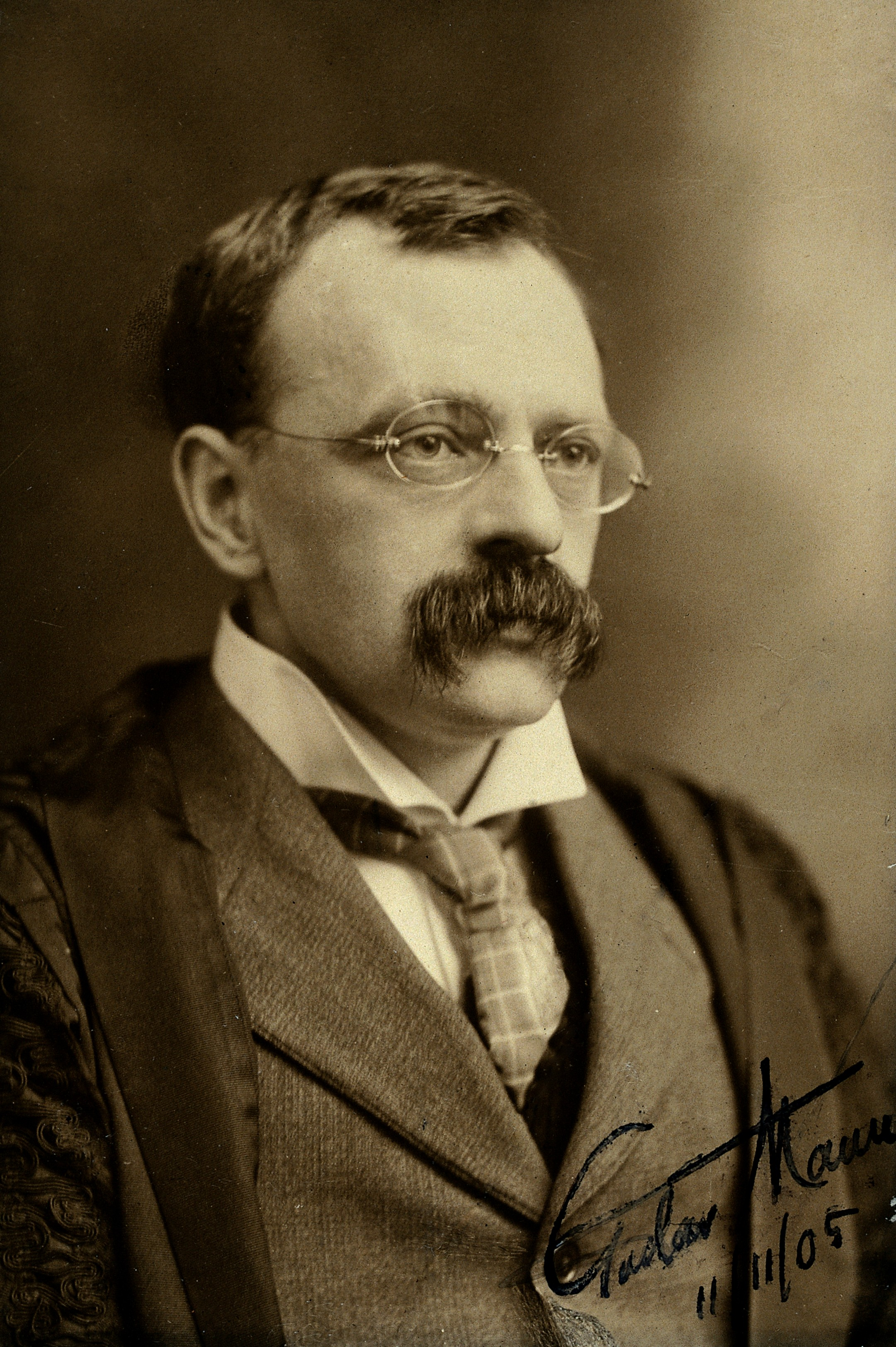
Image of Gustav Mann

Gustav Mann (1836–1916) was a German botanist who led expeditions in West Africa and was also a gardener at the Royal Botanic Gardens, Kew.

Born in the Kingdom of Hanover in 1836, he was chosen by William Jackson Hooker, Director of the Royal Botanic Gardens, Kew, to take part in William Balfour Baikie's expedition to West Africa. While there, he sent numerous specimens back to Kew.

Mann's exploration of the Cameroon mountains is described by Sir Richard Burton in Abeokuta and the Camaroon Mountains vol. 2 Mann later collected specimens in Darjeeling, India, before retiring to Munich, Germany, in 1891.

Some 349 species of plants, the genera Manniella Hook.f. and Manniophyton Muell. Arg.; and Mann's Spring on the Cameroon Mountain bear his name.

== Personal life ==
He married Mary Anne Stovell in 1863. He died in 1916.

== Publications ==
- Mann, G., H. Wendland, Hooker, Sir J. D. On the palms of western tropical Africa. R. Taylor, 1864, London
- Mann, G. List of Assam ferns. C. Wolf & Sohn, 1898, München
- Mann, G. "Physiological Histology, Methods and Theory". Clarendon Press, 1902, Oxford
