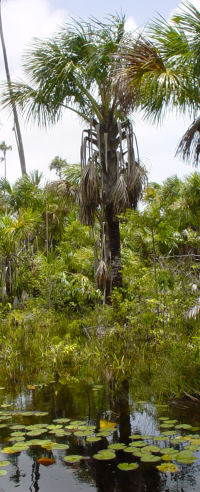
- Mauritia flexuosa

Scientific classification
- Kingdom: Plantae
- Clade: Tracheophytes
- Clade: Angiosperms
- Clade: Monocots
- Clade: Commelinids
- Order: Arecales
- Family: Arecaceae
- Subfamily: Calamoideae
- Tribe: Lepidocaryeae
- Genus: Mauritia; L.f.

Species
- Mauritia carana Mauritia flexuosa

= Mauritia =

Genus of palms

Mauritia is a genus of fan palms which is native to northern South America and to the Island of Trinidad in the Caribbean. Only two species are currently accepted.

Image	Fruit	Scientific name	Distribution
		Mauritia flexuosa	widely distributed across northern South America as far south as Bolivia, extending north to Trinidad
		Mauritia carana	Amazon regions of Brazil, Venezuela, Peru, and Colombia.
