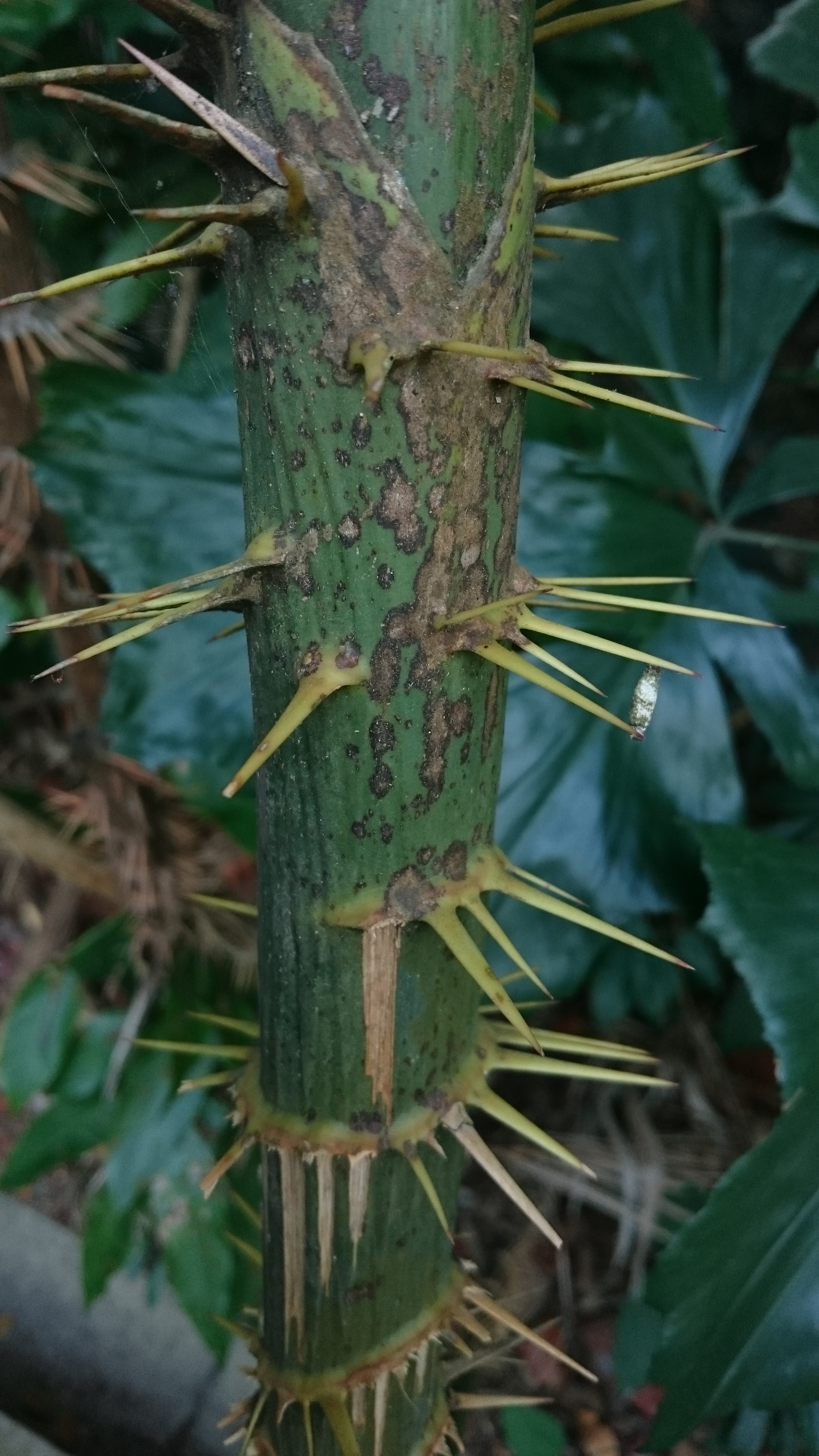

Scientific classification
- Kingdom: Plantae
- Clade: Tracheophytes
- Clade: Angiosperms
- Clade: Monocots
- Clade: Commelinids
- Order: Arecales
- Family: Arecaceae
- Subfamily: Calamoideae
- Tribe: Calameae
- Genus: Myrialepis; Beccari
- Species: M. paradoxa

Binomial name
- Myrialepis paradoxa (Kurz) J.Dransf.

Synonyms
- Bejaudia Gagnep.; Calamus paradoxus Kurz; Palmijuncus paradoxus (Kurz) Kuntze; Plectocomiopsis paradoxa (Kurz) Becc.; Myrialepis scortechinii Becc.; Plectocomiopsis annulata Ridl.; Plectocomiopsis scortechinii (Becc.) Ridl.; Plectocomiopsis floribunda Becc.; Bejaudia cambodiensis Gagnep.; Myrialepis floribunda (Becc.) Gagnep.

= Myrialepis =

Genus of palms

Myrialepis is a monotypic genus of flowering plant in the palm family. The single species, Myrialepis paradoxa, is native to Southeast Asia. The genus name is a combination of the Greek words meaning "innumerable" and "scale", a description of the fruit, and the epithet is Latin for "paradox".

== Description ==
The trunks are clustering and climbing at 7 cm wide and are armed with whorls of sharp, golden spines. Reaching high into the canopy, the red to brown stems retain persistent leaf sheaths in its new growth but become bare toward the base, exposing conspicuous rings of leaf scars. Each mature leaf is comparatively large at 3 m, pinnate, and carried on armed petioles, with widely and regularly spaced, dark green leaflets. The spiny rachis extends well beyond the pinnae and is accompanied by pairs of recurved barbs adapted for climbing.

Dioecious and hapaxanthic, male and female flowers are borne on separate plants, and the completion of flowering results in the death of the stem. The inflorescence is much branched, 60 cm long, and protrudes from the top of the trunk, accompanied by reduced leaves. The pistillate flowers are twice as big as the staminate, but otherwise similar, with the former producing shiny green to brown fruit, irregularly covered in tiny scales, each with one seed.

== Distribution and habitat ==
This palm is found across Assam, Indochina, Burma, Thailand, Cambodia, Laos, Sumatra, Vietnam and peninsular Malaysia up to 1000 m in elevation. Forming large, dense colonies they occupy tropical forests, forest clearings, and river banks.

== Uses ==
Being somewhat disfigured, the trunks are not used in furniture construction but are used for simple thatched basketry. The palm is colloquially called rotan kertong, or simply rattan in Malaysia and Singapore. Names in Cambodia include phdau snaô, phdau miëhs and traëh ach' moën, the stalks of the palm are used in basketry, to make sticks, and to make rope.
