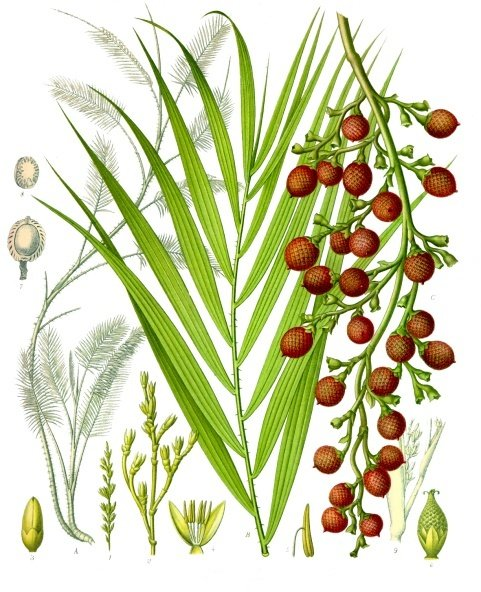
- Calamus draco, a rattan

Scientific classification
- Kingdom: Plantae
- Clade: Tracheophytes
- Clade: Angiosperms
- Clade: Monocots
- Clade: Commelinids
- Order: Arecales
- Family: Arecaceae
- Subfamily: Calamoideae
- Tribe: Calameae; Kunth, 1831

= Calameae =

Tribe of palms

Calameae is a palm tree tribe in the subfamily Calamoideae. The type genus is Calamus and many of its members are rattans.

== Genera ==
- Calamus
- Calospatha (synonym of Calamus)
- Ceratolobus (synonym of Calamus)
- Daemonorops (synonym of Calamus)
- Eleiodoxa
- Korthalsia
- Metroxylon
- Myrialepis
- Pigafetta
- Plectocomia
- Plectocomiopsis
- Pogonotium (synonym of Calamus)
- Retispatha (synonym of Calamus)
- Salacca

== See also ==
Rattan
