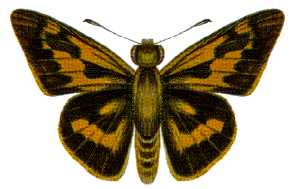
- Cephrenes augiades sperthias
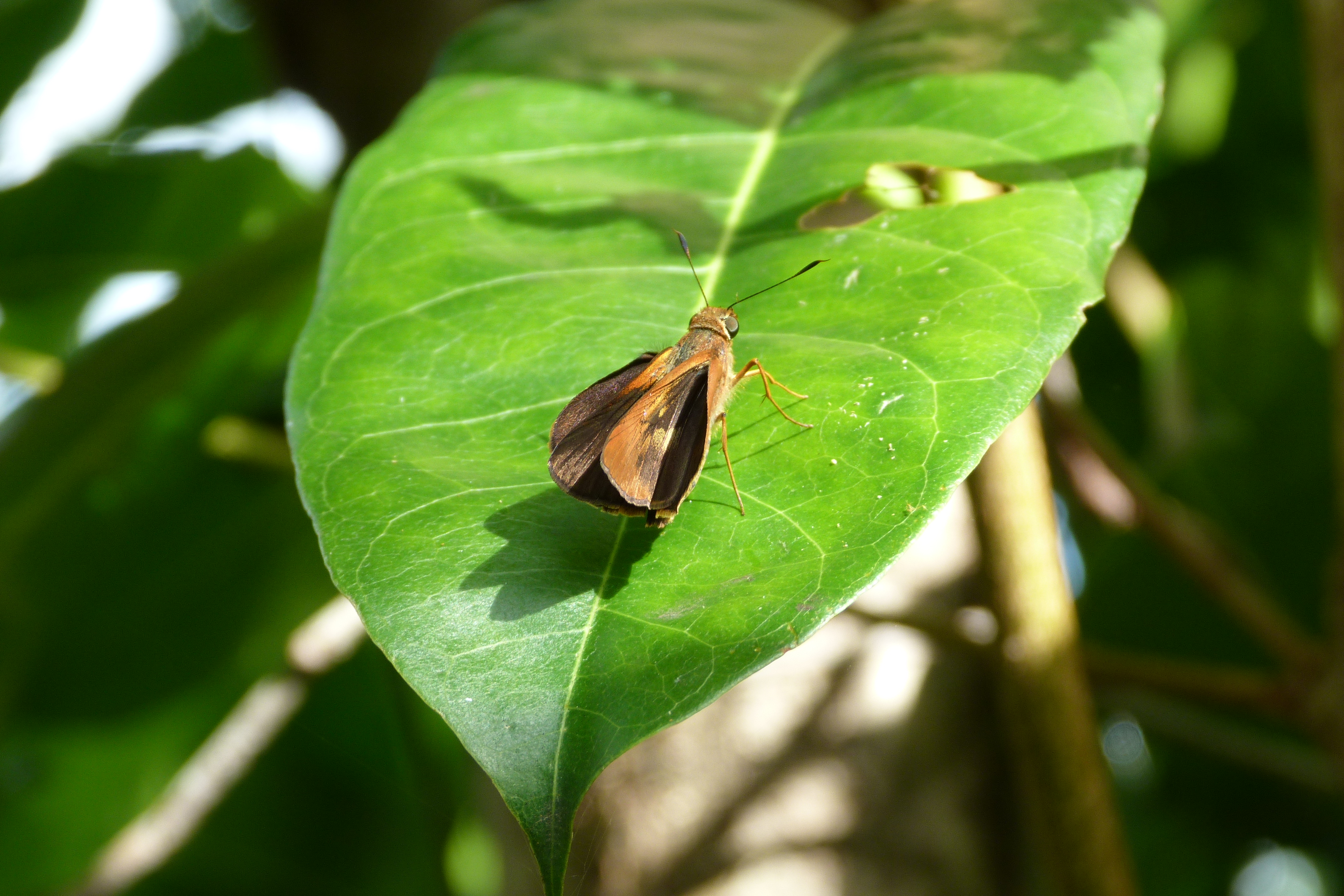

Scientific classification
- Kingdom: Animalia
- Phylum: Arthropoda
- Class: Insecta
- Order: Lepidoptera
- Family: Hesperiidae
- Genus: Cephrenes
- Species: C. augiades

Binomial name
- Cephrenes augiades (C Felder, 1860)

Synonyms
- Hesperia augiades Felder, 1860; Hesperia palmarum Felder, 1862; Hesperia sperthias Felder, 1862; Hesperia macleayi Plötz, 1883; Corone ismenoides Mabille, 1878; Pamphila ulama Butler, 1870

= Cephrenes augiades =

Species of butterfly

Cephrenes augiades, the orange palm dart, is a butterfly of the family Hesperiidae. It is found from Indonesia to the Solomons.

The wingspan is about 40 mm.

== Food ==
The larvae of subspecies sperthias feed on Archontophoenix, Livistona and Phoenix species. During the day it hides within a shelter made by using silk to join fronds of its host plant, which fold together and bend across each other naturally.

Other recorded food plants include:

- Acoelorraphe wrightii
- Aiphanes corallina
- Bentinckia nicobarica
- Butia eriospatha
- Calamus moti
- Carpentaria acuminata
- Carpoxylon macrospermum
- Chamaedorea microspadix
- Chrysalidocarpus cabadae
- Clinostigma samoense
- Crysophila guagara
- Gaussia attenuata
- Gronophyllum microcarpum
- Gulubia macrospadix
- Heterospathe delicatula
- Heterospathe woodfordiana
- Howea belmoreana
- Livistona merrillii
- Oenocarpus
- Phoenix loureirii
- Pinanga bataanensis
- Pinanga coronata
- Pinanga kuhlii
- Pinanga merrillii
- Pritchardia beccariana
- Pritchardia maideniana
- Pritchardia minor
- Ptychosperma bleeseri
- Ptychosperma furcatum
- Ptychosperma lauterbachii
- Ptychosperma lineare
- Ptychosperma salomonense
- Ptychosperma sanderianum
- Ravenea rivularis
- Rhapis excelsa
- Rhopalostylis baueri
- Rhopalostylis sapida
- Roystonea venezuelana
- Sabal mauritiiformis
- Sabal mexicana
- Sabal parvifolia
- Sabal umbraculifera
- Sabal uresana
- Satakentia liukiuensis
- Scheelea butyracea
- Scheelea cephalotes
- Scheelea zonensis
- Syagrus amara
- Syagrus comosa
- Thrinax excelsa
- Trachycarpus martianus
- Trachycarpus wagneranus
- Veitchia merrillii
- Verschaffeltia splendida

== Subspecies ==
- Cephrenes augiades augiades
- Cephrenes augiades sperthias (C. Felder, 1862) (south-eastern coast of New South Wales and the northern Gulf and north-eastern coast of Queensland)
- Cephrenes augiades tara Evans, 1935 (Batchian)
- Cephrenes augiades arua Evans, 1935 (Papua)
- Cephrenes augiades bruno Evans, 1935 (Papua)
- Cephrenes augiades burua Evans, 1935 (Buru)
- Cephrenes augiades meeki Evans, 1935 (Papua)
- Cephrenes augiades tenimbra Evans, 1935
- Cephrenes augiades websteri Evans, 1935 (New Britain)
