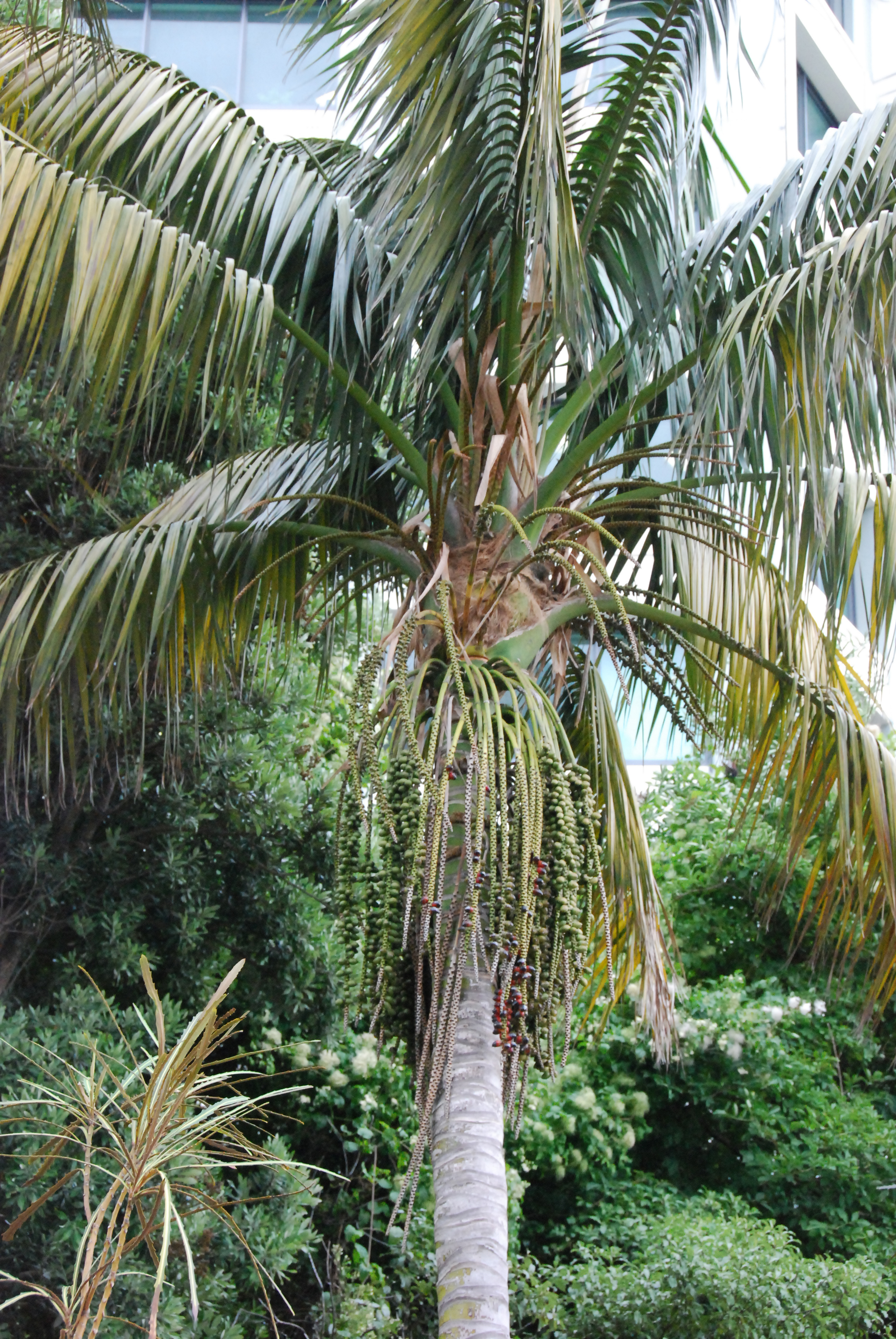
- Howea forsteriana

Scientific classification
- Kingdom: Plantae
- Clade: Tracheophytes
- Clade: Angiosperms
- Clade: Monocots
- Clade: Commelinids
- Order: Arecales
- Family: Arecaceae
- Subfamily: Arecoideae
- Tribe: Areceae
- Subtribe: Linospadicinae; Hook.f.

= Laccospadicinae =

Subtribe of palms

Laccospadicinae (formerly Linospadicinae) is a subtribe of plants in the family Arecaceae.

Genera:

- Calyptrocalyx
- Howea
- Laccospadix
- Linospadix
