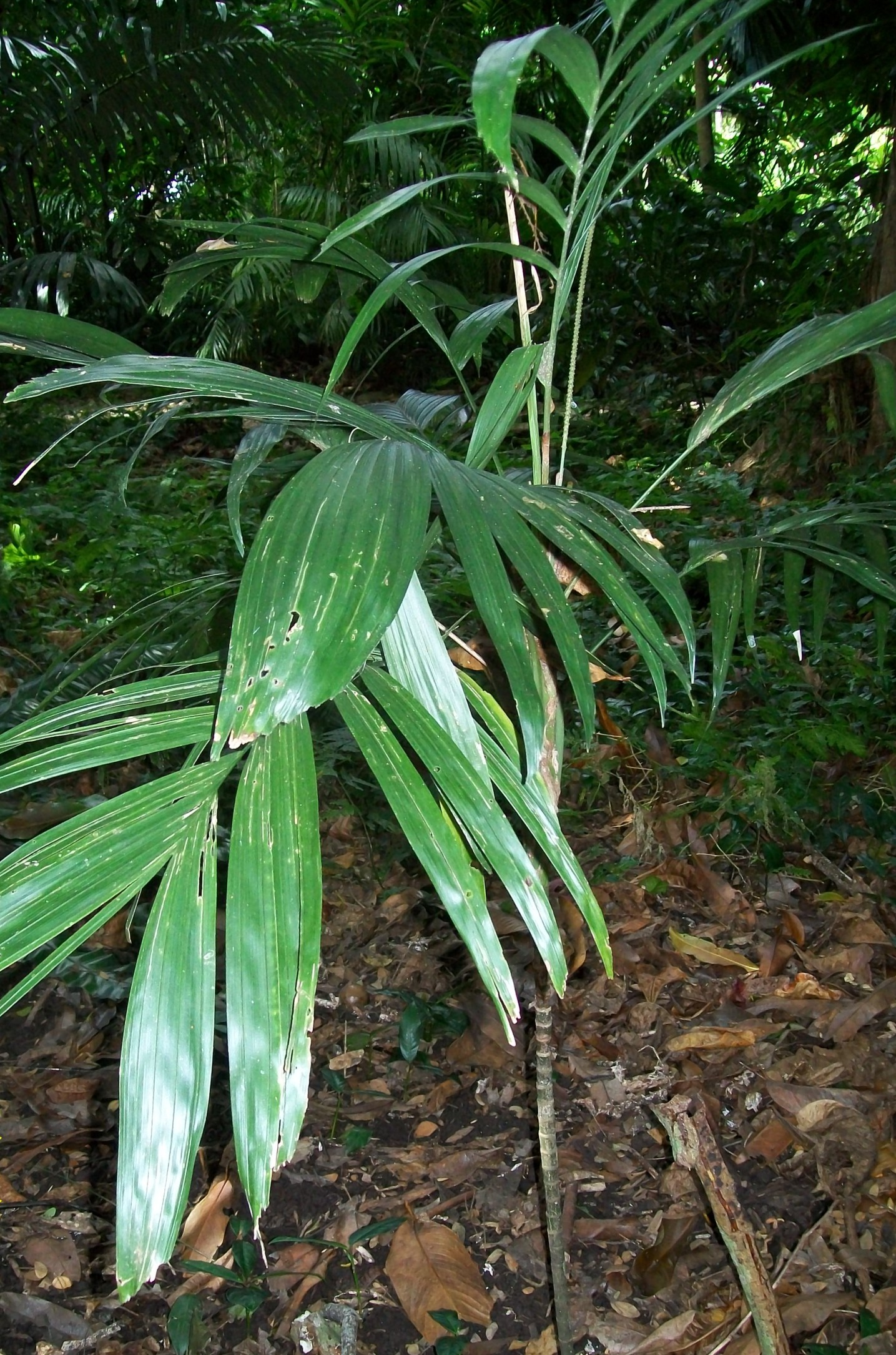
- Linospadix minor, Cairns Botanical Gardens, Queensland, Australia

Scientific classification
- Kingdom: Plantae
- Clade: Tracheophytes
- Clade: Angiosperms
- Clade: Monocots
- Clade: Commelinids
- Order: Arecales
- Family: Arecaceae
- Genus: Linospadix
- Species: L. minor

Binomial name
- Linospadix minor (W.Hill) Burret.

Synonyms
- Areca minor W.Hill; Bacularia minor (W.Hill) F.Muell.; Kentia minor (W.Hill) F.Muell.; Bacularia intermedia C.T.White; Linospadix intermedia (C.T.White) R.W.Johnson

= Linospadix minor =

Species of palm

Linospadix minor (also known as Bacularia intermedia), more commonly known as the minor walking stick palm (being smaller in stature than the walking stick palm Linospadix monostachyos ) is a small North-East Queensland tropical forest palm with stems between 7mm and 20mm in diameter, growing from 1 m to 5 m high, with semi-glossy dark green leaves, and a crown of 7 to 12 leaves

The minor walking stick palm has a limited distribution in the rainforests of the southern Mcllwraith Range (Cape York Peninsula), and is most abundant in the Queensland's wet tropical forests south of Cooktown (Mount Amos area) to Mission Beach (Licuala State Forest) and as far inland as Windsor Tableland (from 0–1200 m elevation)
