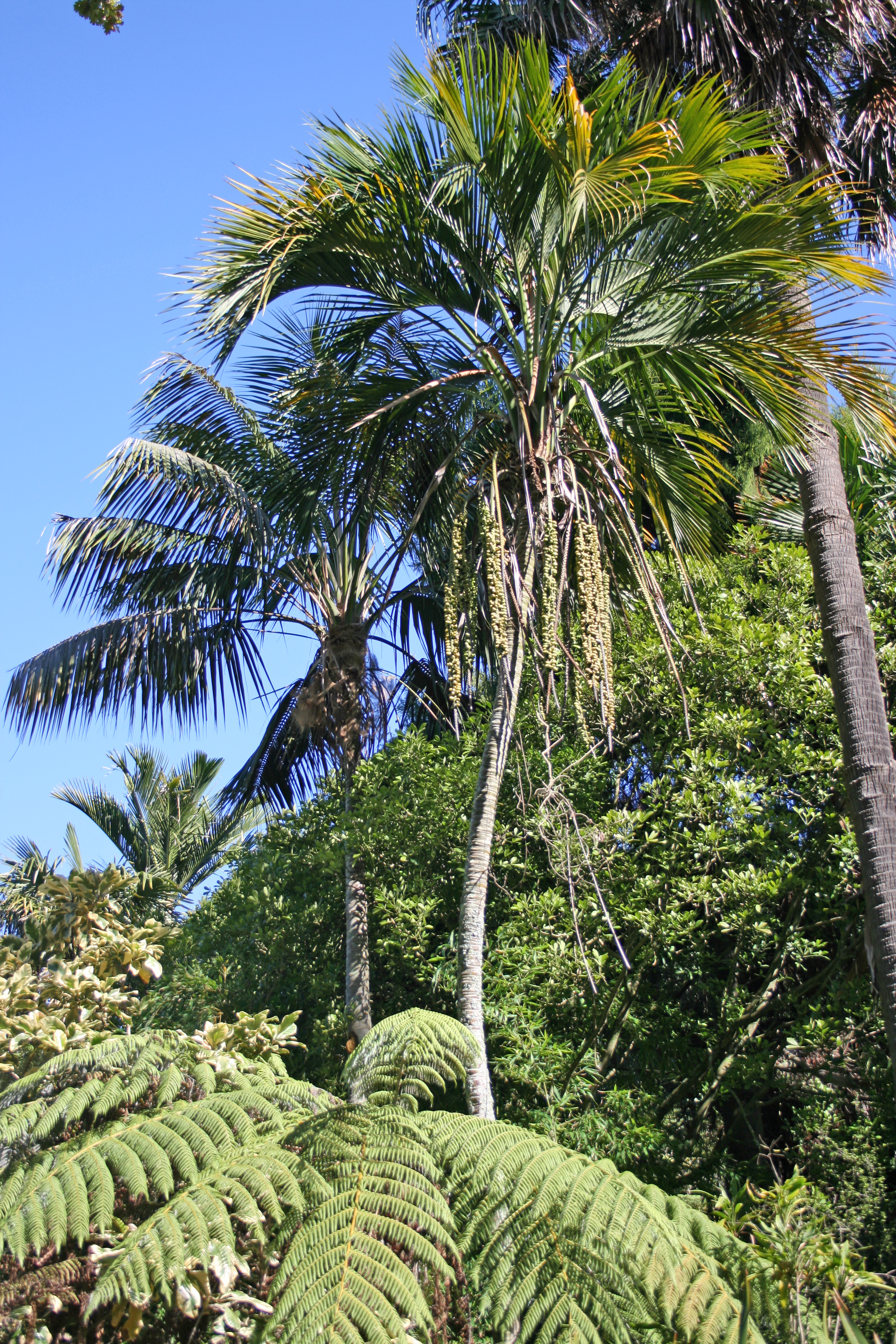
- Howea forsteriana, left, and H. belmoreana, centre

Scientific classification
- Kingdom: Plantae
- Clade: Tracheophytes
- Clade: Angiosperms
- Clade: Monocots
- Clade: Commelinids
- Order: Arecales
- Family: Arecaceae
- Subfamily: Arecoideae
- Tribe: Areceae
- Subtribe: Linospadicinae
- Genus: Howea; Becc.

Species
- Howea belmoreana; Howea forsteriana
- Both Howea spp. are endemic to Lord Howe Island

= Howea =

Genus of palms

Howea is a genus of two palms, H. belmoreana and H. forsteriana, both endemic to Lord Howe Island, Australia. H. forsteriana in particular is commonly grown as an indoor plant in the Northern Hemisphere, and the two species form the mainstay of the island's palm seed industry and more importantly its trade in newly germinated seedlings. The palms are also cultivated on Norfolk Island, where seeds are produced for export.

== Description ==
Both Howea species are unarmed, monoecious palms of moderate size. The trunk is erect, bare, and carries prominent leaf scars, with its base sometimes expanded into a knob-like shape. There is no crownshaft. The leaves are pinnate, and the well-developed sheaths eventually disintegrate into a criss-crossed mass of fine fibres around the trunk. The inflorescences, erect at first but later pendulous, appear between the leaf stems, although as a result of leaf-fall they may appear to have arisen from below the leaves.

== Species identification ==
The two species can be distinguished by leaf anatomy: H. forsteriana has rather flat fronds with elegantly drooping leaflets, while H. belmoreana has curved leaves with erect leaflets giving the fronds a more angular appearance. More technically, if the inflorescence is a single spike and the rachis of the leaves is arcuate, the species is H. belmoreana. If the inflorescence consists of 3 to 5 (up to a maximum of 8) spikes arising from a single broad base, and the rachis of central and lower leaves is horizontal and drooping, the species is H. forsteriana.

== Distribution ==
H. forsteriana is common in lowland forest on Lord Howe Island, preferring sandy soils. H. belmoreana occurs as scattered individuals with H. forsteriana, but becomes abundant at higher elevations up to 450 metres. Hybridisation between the two species is rare because H. forsteriana flowers seven weeks earlier than H. belmoreana.

== Cultivation ==
Lord Howe Island, at approximately 31°S, has a subtropical climate. Summers are mild to warm with regular rain, and winters are wetter and somewhat cooler. Average maximum temperatures range between 17 °C and 20 °C in winter and from 24 °C to 27 °C in the summer. In winter, average minimum temperatures range between 12 °C and 15 °C, and 18 °C to 22 °C in summer. Humidity averages in the 60 to 70 per cent range all year round.

Howea spp. grow well in subtropical climes, and are hardy to the USDA zone 9b. They are widely grown in warm temperate climates, and there are also occasional healthy specimens in tropical areas such as Hawaii. H. belmoreana, with its erect fronds and aversion to life in a pot, is not as commonly cultivated indoors as the graceful H. forsteriana, which is often referred to as the Kentia palm.

== Sources ==
- Dransfield, John, Natalie W Uhl, Conny B Asmussen, William J Baker, Madeline M Harley, and Carl E Lewis 2005. 'A new phylogenetic classification of the palm family, Arecaceae'. Kew Bulletin, Vol. 60 (2005).
- Uhl, Natalie W. and Dransfield, John 1987. Genera Palmarum - A classification of palms based on the work of Harold E. Moore. Allen Press, Lawrence, Kansas. ISBN 0-935868-30-5 / ISBN 978-0-935868-30-2.
- Flora of Australia Online, Howea, accessed 31 July 2008
