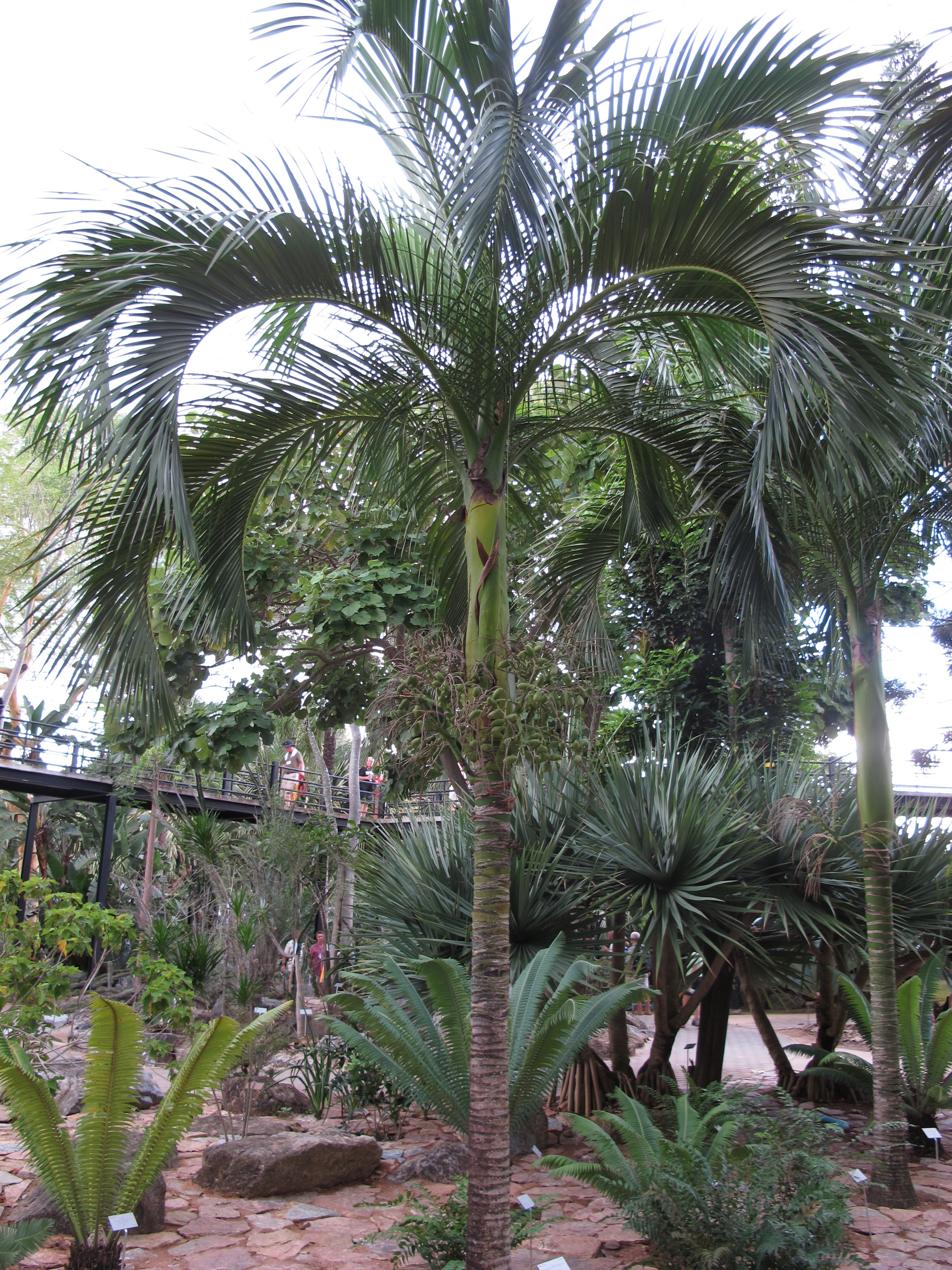
- Carpoxylon macrospermum

Scientific classification
- Kingdom: Plantae
- Clade: Tracheophytes
- Clade: Angiosperms
- Clade: Monocots
- Clade: Commelinids
- Order: Arecales
- Family: Arecaceae
- Tribe: Areceae
- Subtribe: Carpoxylinae

= Carpoxylinae =

Subtribe of palms

Carpoxylinae is a subtribe of plants in the family Arecaceae.

Genera:

- Carpoxylon
- Neoveitchia
- Satakentia
