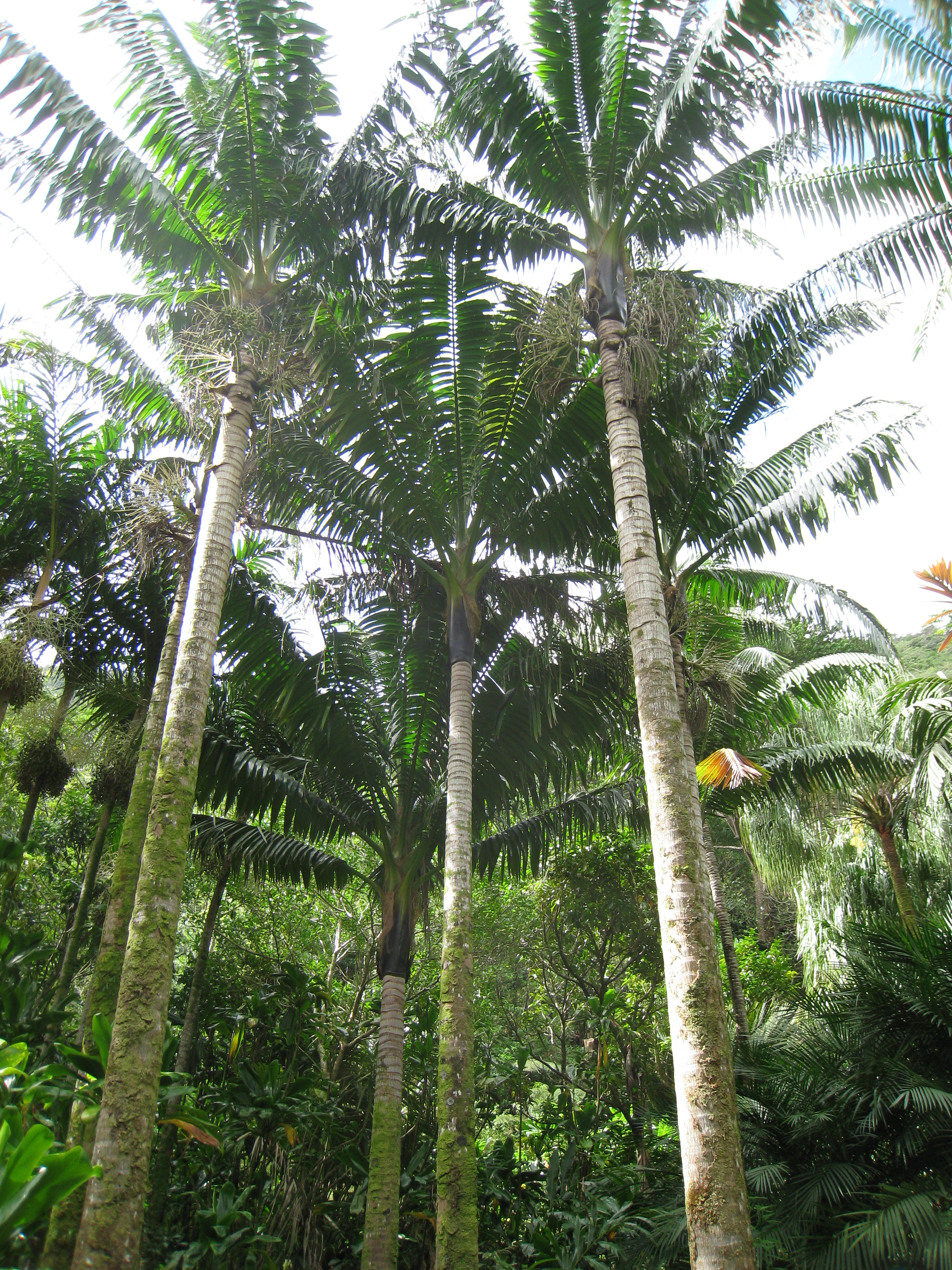

Conservation status
- Endangered (IUCN 3.1)

Scientific classification
- Kingdom: Plantae
- Clade: Tracheophytes
- Clade: Angiosperms
- Clade: Monocots
- Clade: Commelinids
- Order: Arecales
- Family: Arecaceae
- Genus: Neoveitchia
- Species: N. storckii

Binomial name
- Neoveitchia storckii (H.A. Wendl.) Becc.

= Neoveitchia storckii =

Species of palm

Neoveitchia storckii is a species of palm tree. It is native to Fiji. It grows in rainforests and is endangered by habitat loss.
