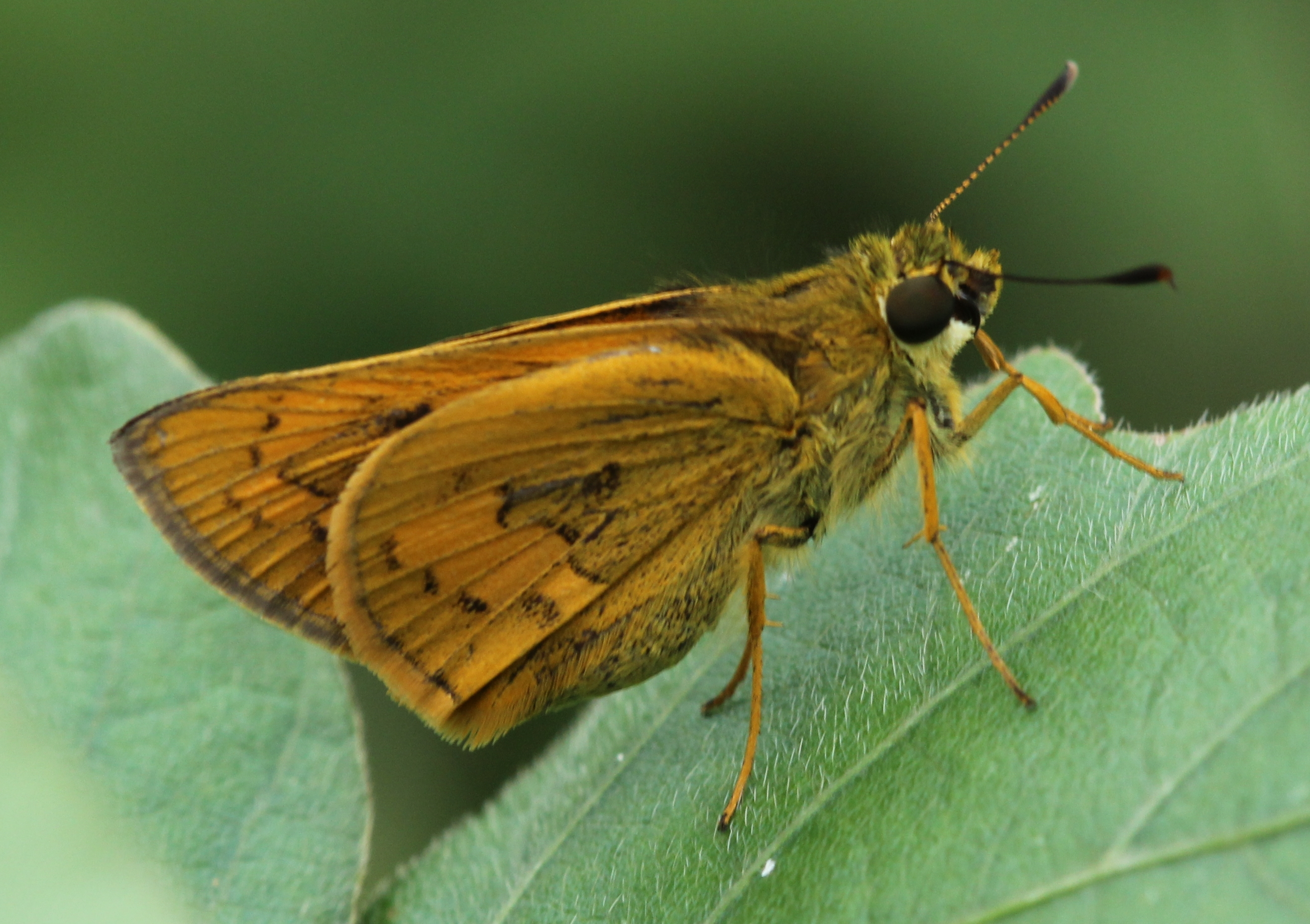

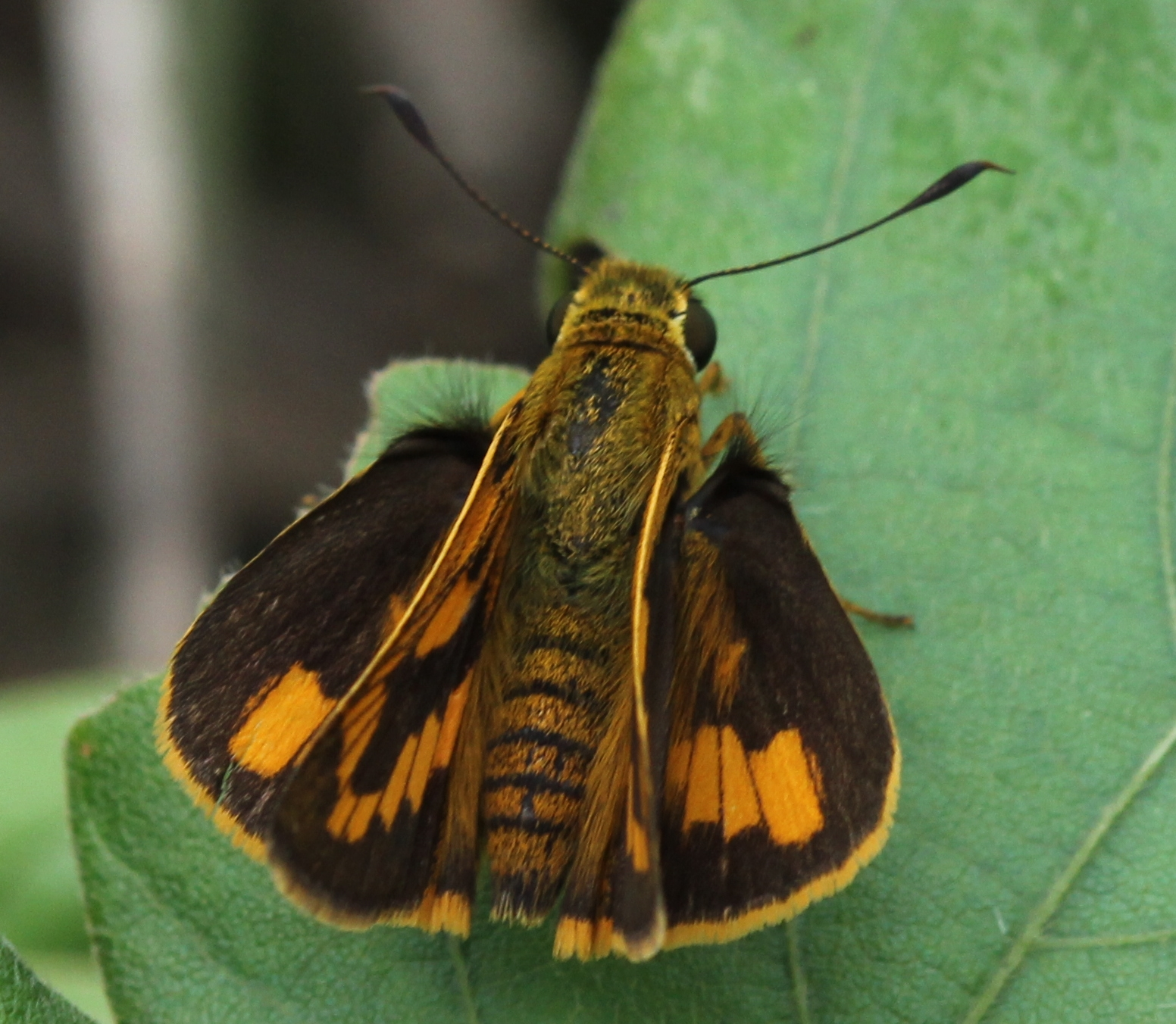

Scientific classification
- Kingdom: Animalia
- Phylum: Arthropoda
- Class: Insecta
- Order: Lepidoptera
- Family: Hesperiidae
- Genus: Cephrenes
- Species: C. acalle

Binomial name
- Cephrenes acalle Hopffer, 1874

Synonyms
- Hesperia chrysozona Plötz, 1883; Telicota negrosiana Fruhstorfer, 1911; Telicota oceanica Mabille, 1904; Telicota hainanum Sonan, 1938; Padraona chrysozona kayapu Doherty, 1891; Telicota baweana Fruhstorfer, 1911

= Cephrenes acalle =

Plain palm dart

Species of butterfly

Cephrenes acalle, commonly known as the plain palm dart, is a butterfly belonging to the family Hesperiidae. An examination of the type specimen showed that it was identical to Cephrenes chrysozona lompa Evans 1934 based on genitalia. This has led to Cephrenes chrysozona being treated as a synonym. The species breeds on palms including coconut, Calamus, Elaeis, Roystonea and Prychosperma.

== Subspecies ==
There are seven subspecies within the distribution range that extends from India through Indo-China into the Philippines.

- Cephrenes acalle acalle
- Cephrenes acalle oceanica (Mabille, 1904) (India, Papua)
- Cephrenes acalle kayapu (Doherty, 1891) (Engano)
- Cephrenes acalle nicobarica Evans, 1932 (Nicobars)
- Cephrenes acalle chrysozona (Plötz, 1883) (Type locality: Philippines)
- Cephrenes acalle kliana Evans, 1934 (Borneo)
- Cephrenes acalle niasicus Plotz, 1886
