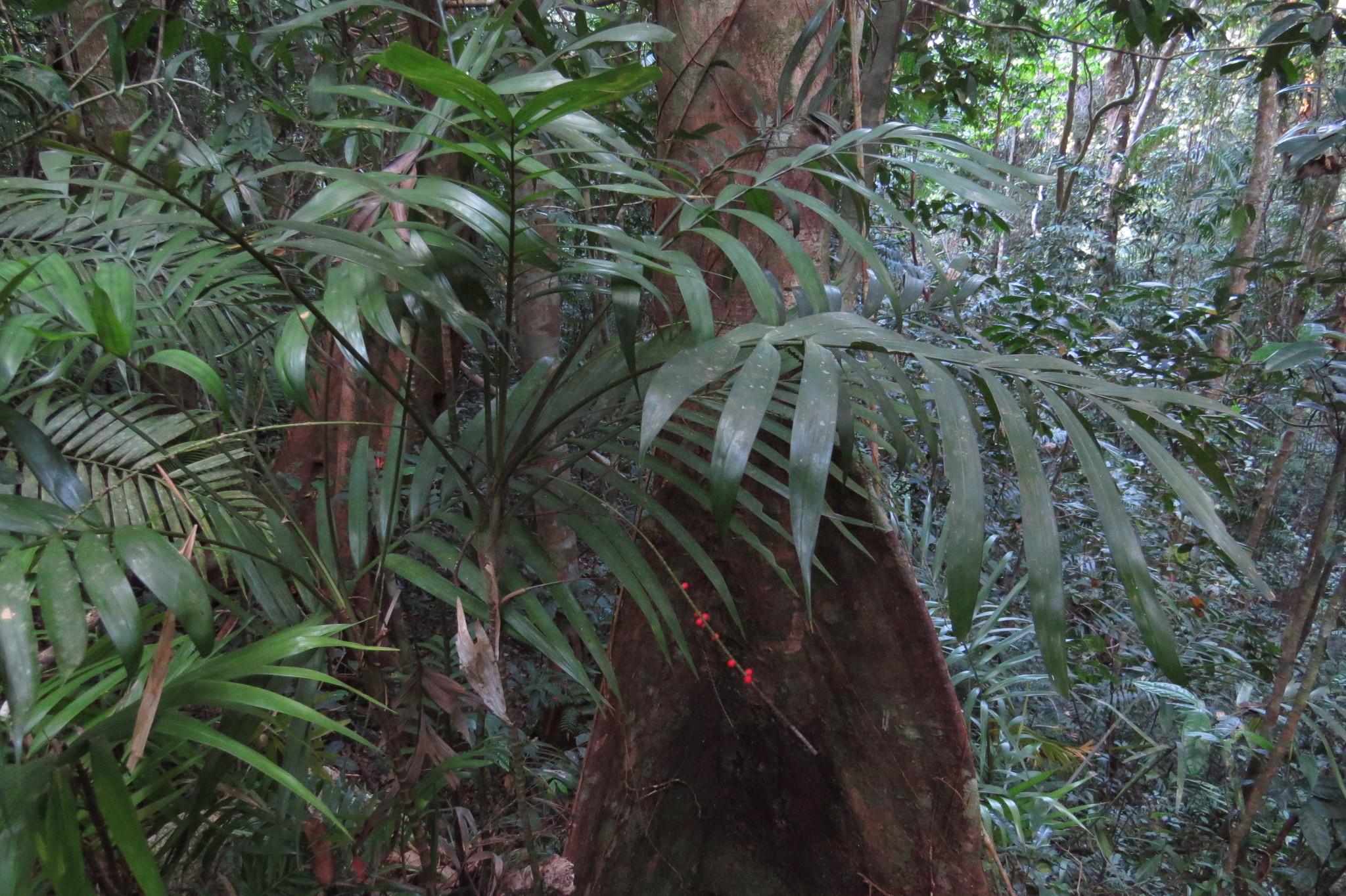

Conservation status
- Near Threatened (IUCN 2.3)

Scientific classification
- Kingdom: Plantae
- Clade: Embryophytes
- Clade: Tracheophytes
- Clade: Spermatophytes
- Clade: Angiosperms
- Clade: Monocots
- Clade: Commelinids
- Order: Arecales
- Family: Arecaceae
- Genus: Linospadix
- Species: L. microcaryus

Binomial name
- Linospadix microcaryus (Domin) Burret

Synonyms
- Bacularia microcarya Domin; Bacularia sessilifolia Becc.; Bacularia sessilifolia var. multisecta Becc. ex Martelli; Linospadix sessilifolius (Becc.) R.W.Johnson

= Linospadix microcaryus =

Species of palm

Linospadix microcaryus is a species of flowering plant in the family Arecaceae. It is found only in northeastern Queensland.

It is threatened by habitat loss.
