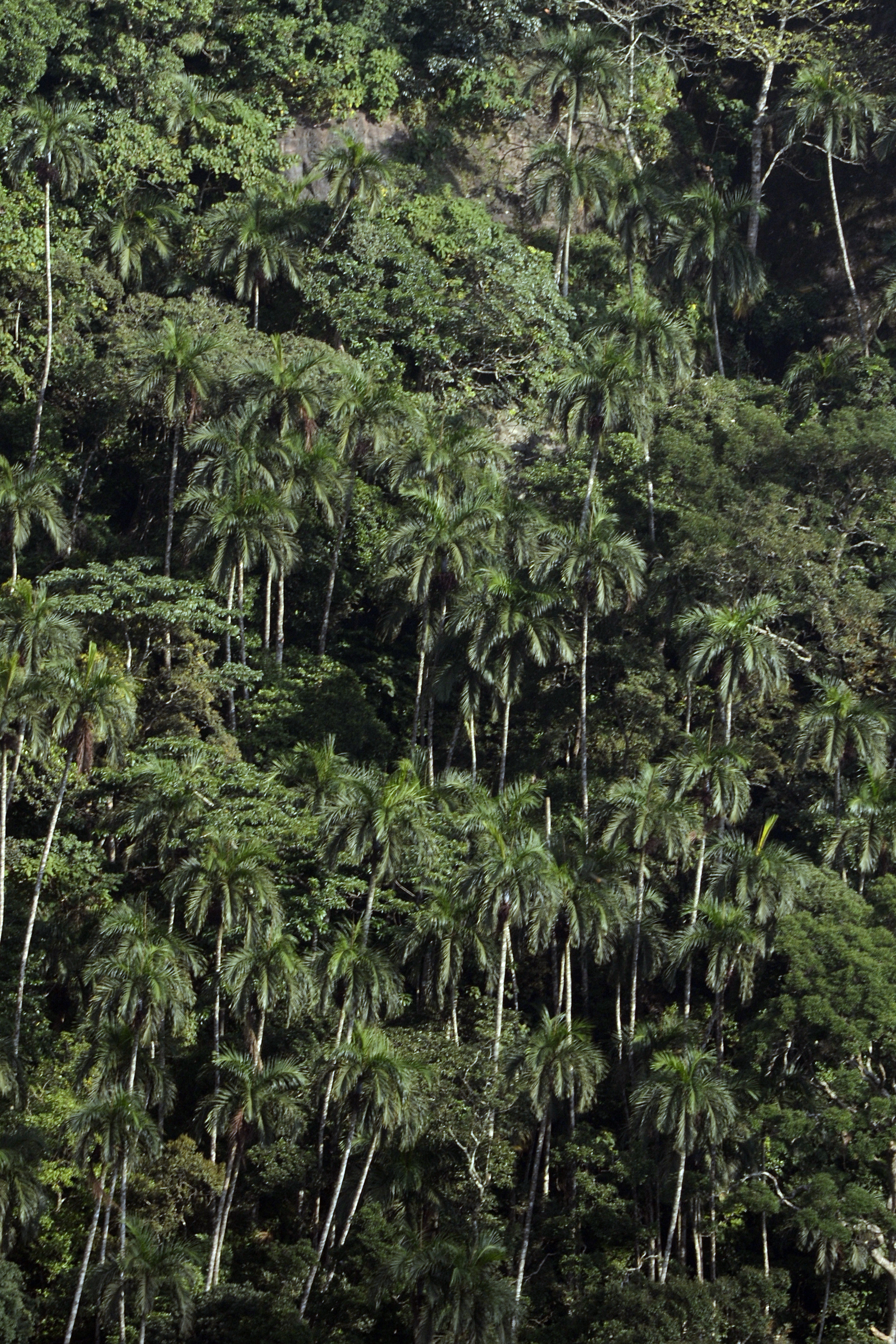
- Bentinckia condapanna

Scientific classification
- Kingdom: Plantae
- Clade: Tracheophytes
- Clade: Angiosperms
- Clade: Monocots
- Clade: Commelinids
- Order: Arecales
- Family: Arecaceae
- Subfamily: Arecoideae
- Tribe: Areceae
- Genus: Bentinckia; Berry ex Roxb.

Synonyms
- Keppleria Mart. ex Endl.

= Bentinckia =

Genus of palms

Bentinckia is a genus of palms in the family Arecaceae. The genus is named after William Henry Cavendish-Bentinck a colonial governor general of British India. There are two species of palms in this genus. namely Bentinckia condapanna and Bentinckia nicobarica.

== Distribution ==
Bentinckia condapanna is endemic to southern Western Ghats, where it occurs in steep rocky slopes in montane rainforests.

Bentinckia nicobarica is restricted to the lowland rainforest in the Nicobar Islands.
