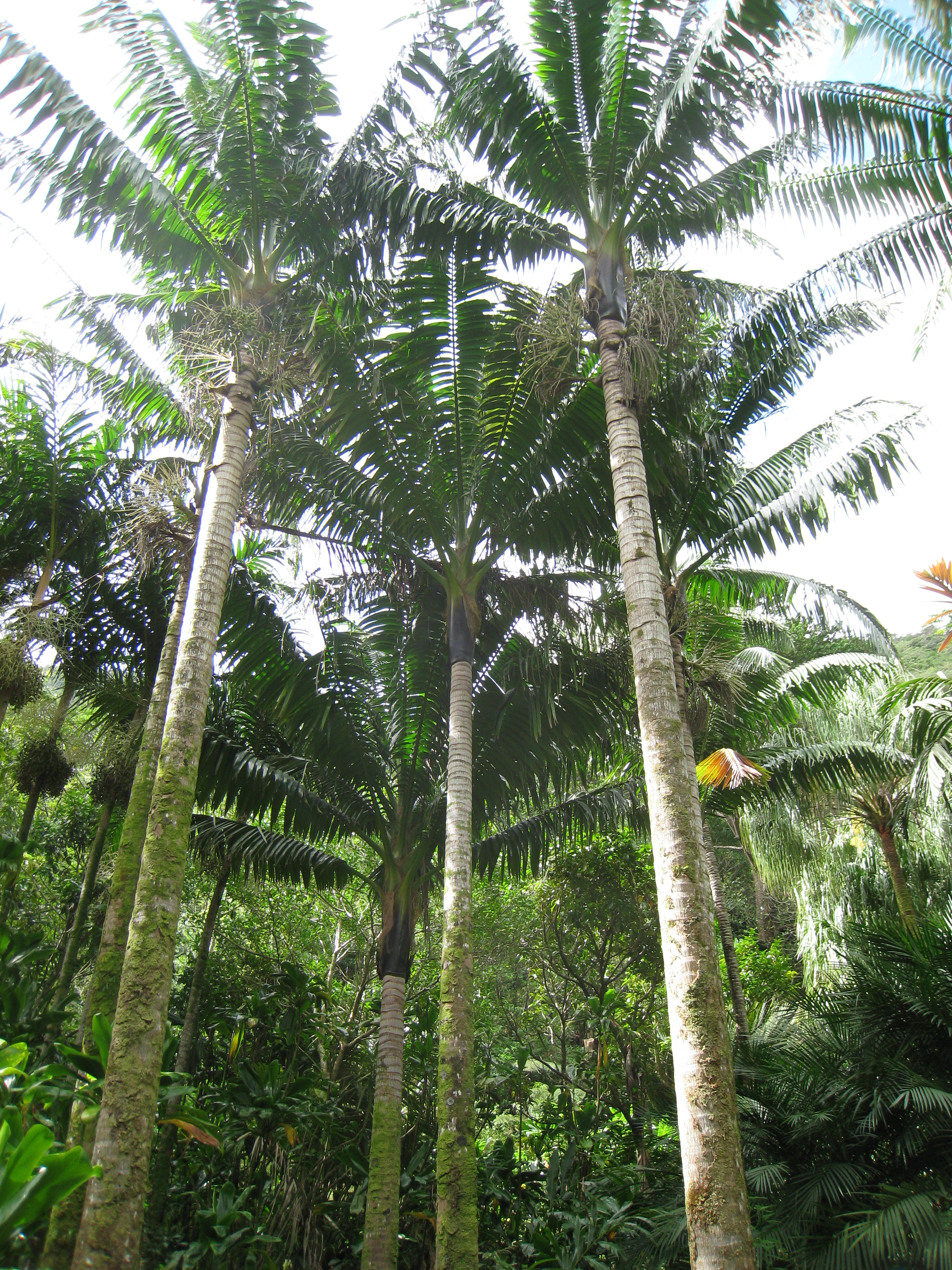
- Neoveitchia storckii

Scientific classification
- Kingdom: Plantae
- Clade: Tracheophytes
- Clade: Angiosperms
- Clade: Monocots
- Clade: Commelinids
- Order: Arecales
- Family: Arecaceae
- Subfamily: Arecoideae
- Tribe: Areceae
- Subtribe: Carpoxylinae
- Genus: Neoveitchia; Becc.

= Neoveitchia =

Genus of palms

Neoveitchia is a genus of palm trees. It contains two known species, native to certain islands in the western Pacific:

- Neoveitchia brunnea Dowe - Vanuatu
- Neoveitchia storckii (H.Wendl.) Becc. - Fiji
