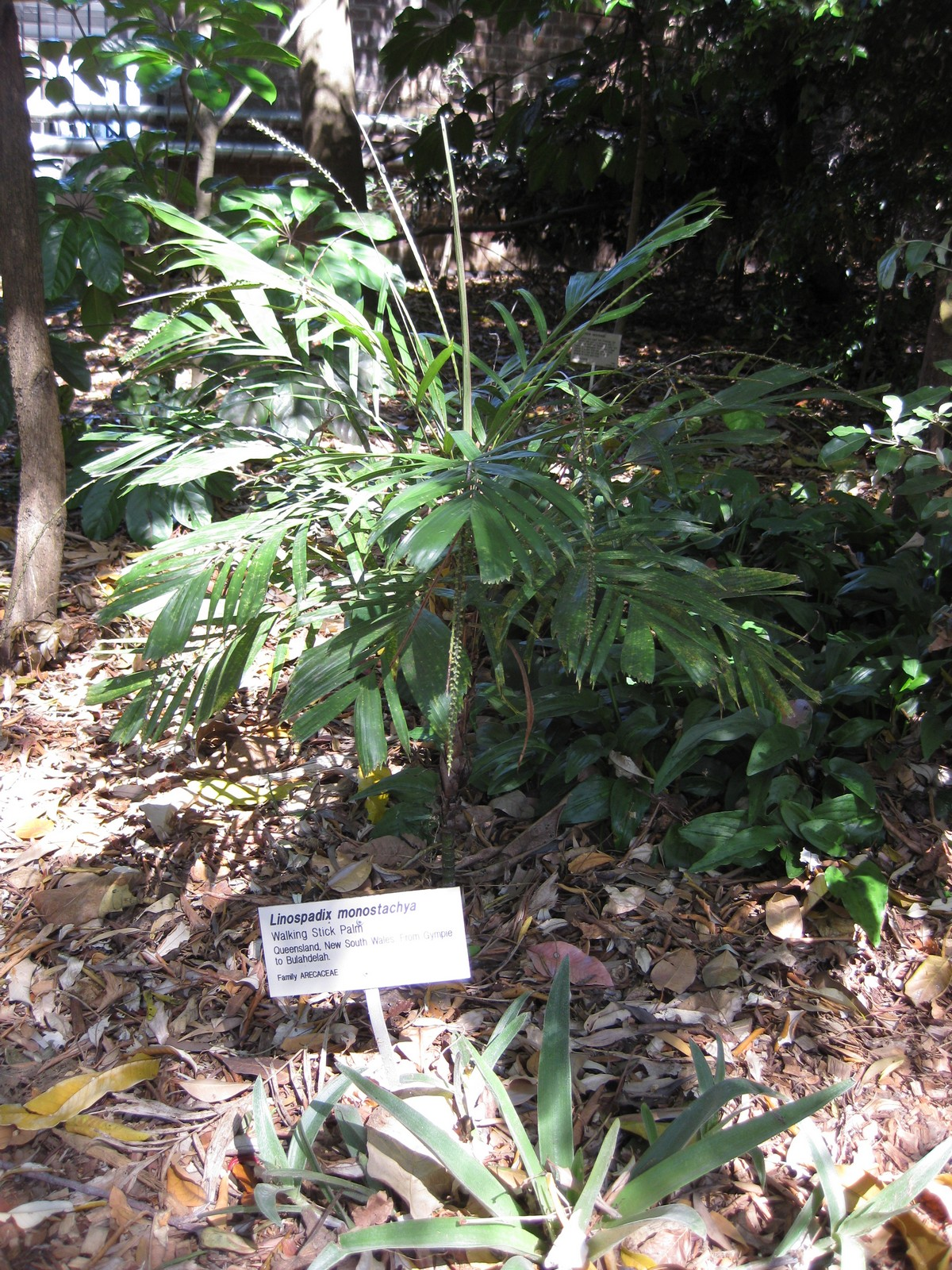
- Linospadix monostachyos, Royal Botanic Gardens Sydney, Australia

Scientific classification
- Kingdom: Plantae
- Clade: Tracheophytes
- Clade: Angiosperms
- Clade: Monocots
- Clade: Commelinids
- Order: Arecales
- Family: Arecaceae
- Subfamily: Arecoideae
- Tribe: Areceae
- Subtribe: Linospadicinae
- Genus: Linospadix; H.Wendl.

Synonyms
- Bacularia F.Muell

= Linospadix =

Genus of plants

Linospadix is a genus of flowering plant in the family Arecaceae. It is native to New Guinea and Australia.

It contains the following species:

- Linospadix albertisianus (Becc.) Burret - New Guinea
- Linospadix apetiolatus Dowe & A.K.Irvine - Queensland
- Linospadix caninus (Becc.) Burret - Western New Guinea
- Linospadix microcaryus (Domin) Burret - Queensland
- Linospadix minor (W.Hill) Burret - Minor walking stick palm - Queensland
- Linospadix monostachyos (Mart.) H.Wendl. - Walking stick palm - Queensland, New South Wales
- Linospadix palmerianus (F.M.Bailey) Burret - Queensland

formerly included

- Linospadix leptostachys Burret = Calyptrocalyx sessiliflorus Dowe & M.D.Ferrero - Papua New Guinea
