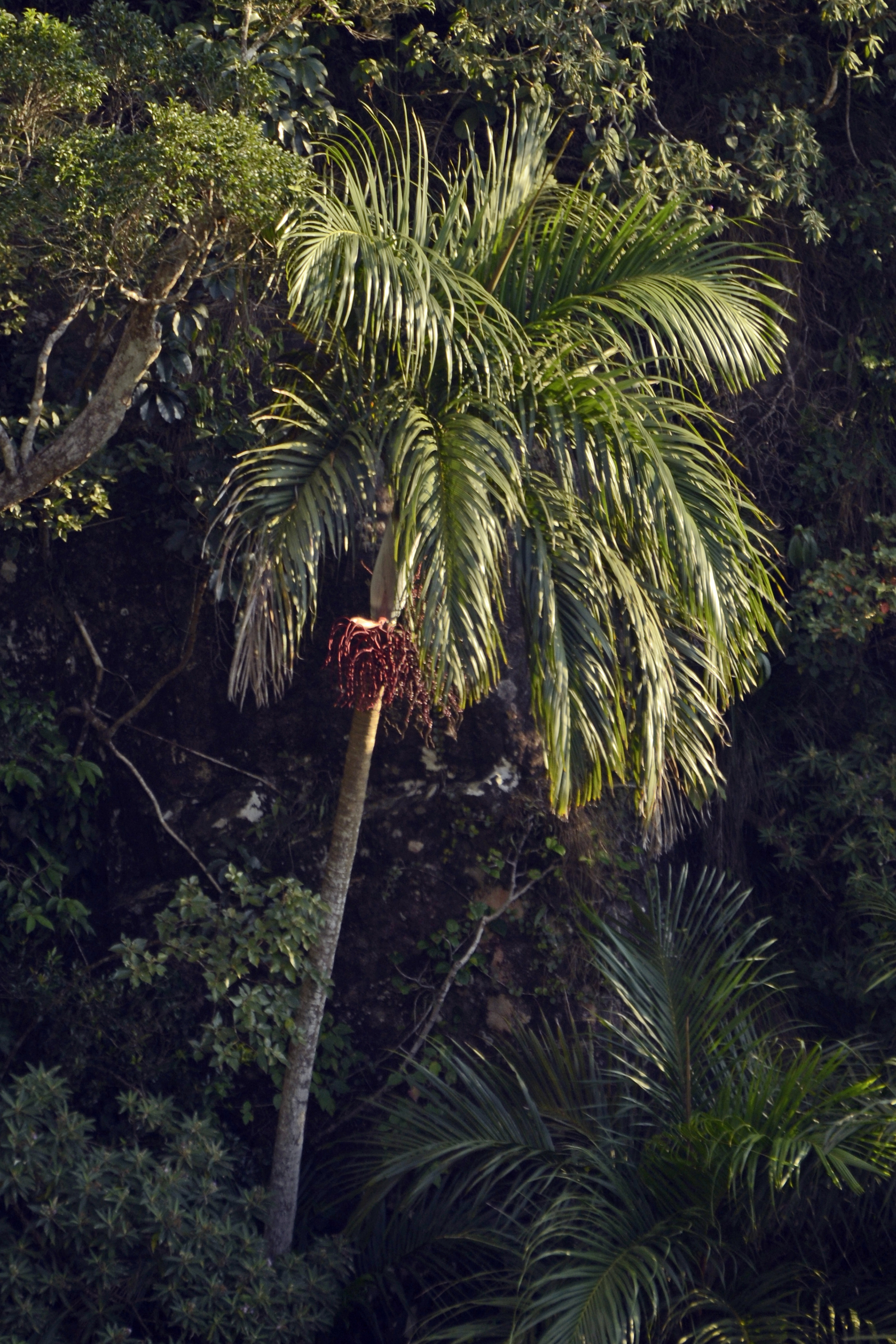

Conservation status
- Vulnerable (IUCN 2.3)

Scientific classification
- Kingdom: Plantae
- Clade: Tracheophytes
- Clade: Angiosperms
- Clade: Monocots
- Clade: Commelinids
- Order: Arecales
- Family: Arecaceae
- Genus: Bentinckia
- Species: B. condapanna

Binomial name
- Bentinckia condapanna Berry

= Bentinckia condapanna =

Species of palm

Bentinckia condapanna, the hill areca nut, is a species of flowering plant in the family Arecaceae. It is found only in India. It is threatened by habitat loss. This palm is mainly found in the evergreen forests of Western Ghats of India.

== Description ==
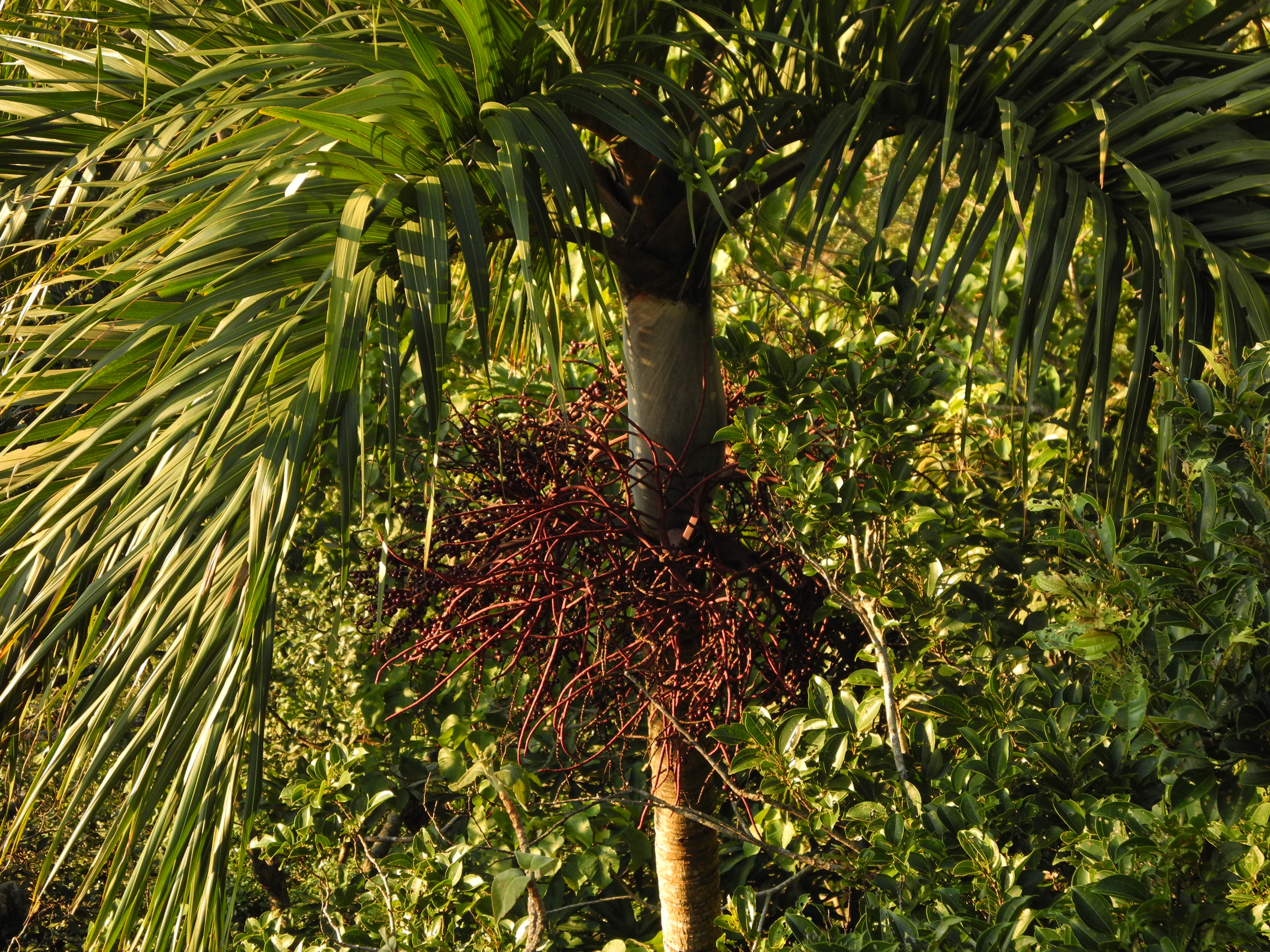
Bentinckia condapanna, with fruits.

It is a monoecious tree. It grows generally on the steep rocky slopes and cliffs in the rainforests of the southern Western Ghats. It is endemic to this region. It is found mainly at an altitude of 1000–1800 msl. This palm grows up to 10m tall with the girth of about 15 cm. Flowers and nuts can be seen throughout the year. Although it is restricted to certain isolated regions, it is common in few places within its distributional range. Its heart is eaten by the local tribal people.
