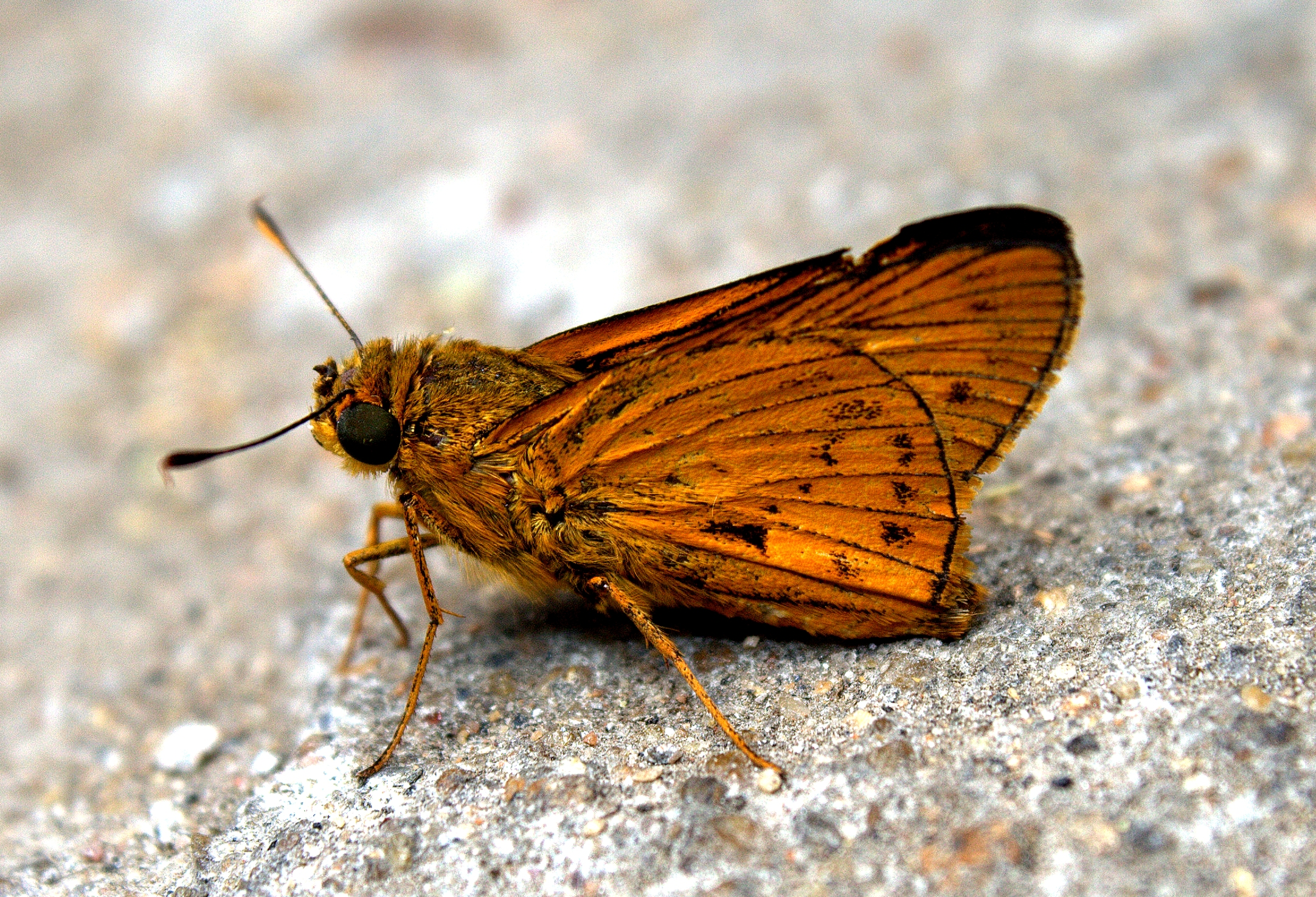
- Cephrenes acalle

Scientific classification
- Kingdom: Animalia
- Phylum: Arthropoda
- Class: Insecta
- Order: Lepidoptera
- Family: Hesperiidae
- Tribe: Taractrocerini
- Genus: Cephrenes; Waterhouse & Lyell, 1914

= Cephrenes =

Genus of butterflies

Cephrenes is a genus of skipper butterflies in the family Hesperiidae. The genus is shared between the Indomalayan realm and the Australasian realm. Larvae feed on a variety of palms (Arecaceae) especially Cocos nucifera (coconut), and Calamus (rattan).

== Species ==
- Cephrenes acalle (Hopffer, 1874) Sulawesi, Borneo
- Cephrenes augiades (Felder, 1860)
- Cephrenes carna Evans, 1934 New Guinea
- Cephrenes moseleyi (Butler, 1884) New Guinea
- Cephrenes trichopepla (Lower, 1908)
