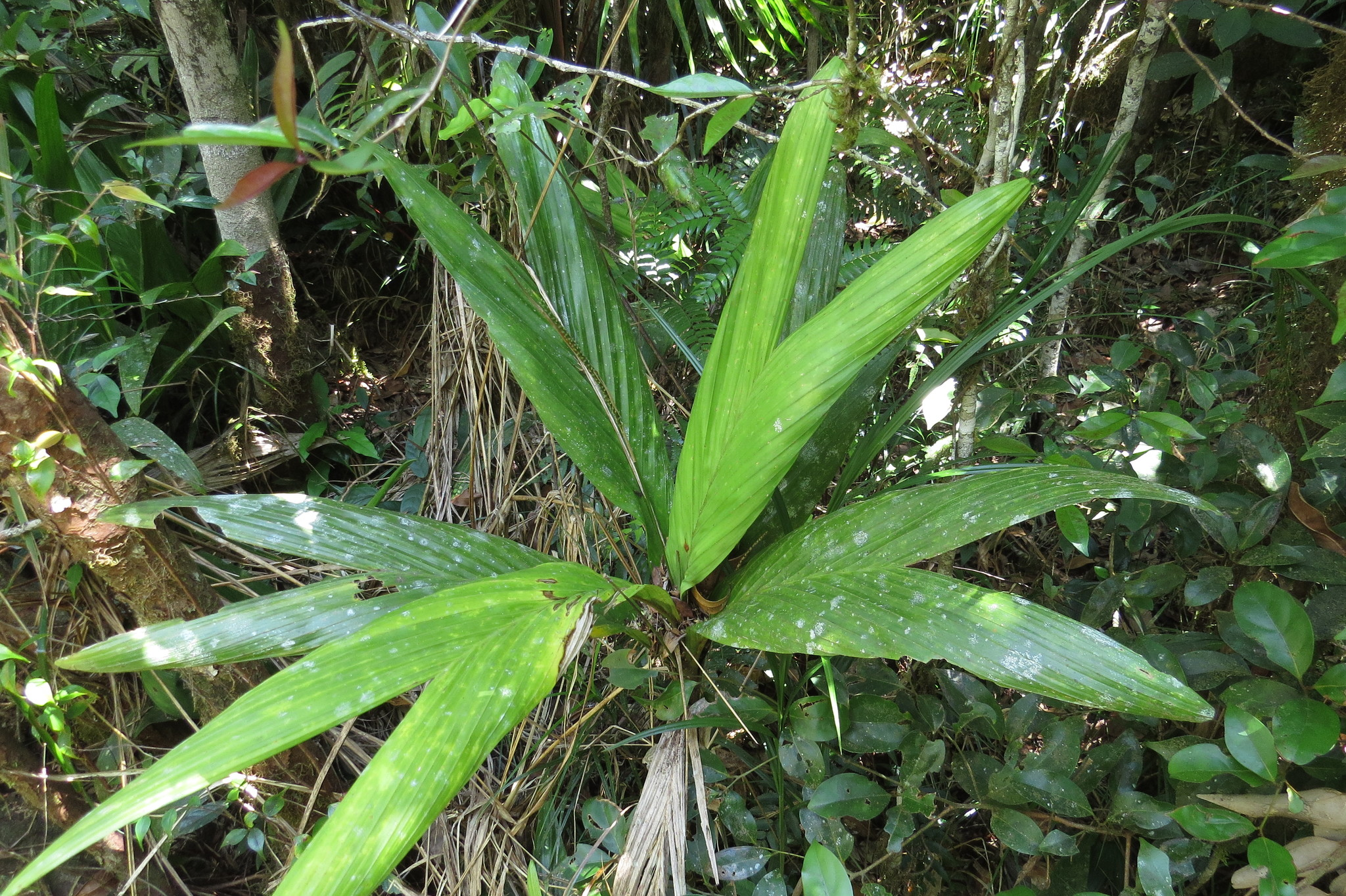

Conservation status
- Least Concern (NCA)

Scientific classification
- Kingdom: Plantae
- Clade: Tracheophytes
- Clade: Angiosperms
- Clade: Monocots
- Clade: Commelinids
- Order: Arecales
- Family: Arecaceae
- Genus: Linospadix
- Species: L. apetiolatus

Binomial name
- Linospadix apetiolatus J.L.Dowe

= Linospadix apetiolatus =

Species of flowering plant

Linospadix apetiolatus, commonly known as walking stick palm or Mount Lewis walking-stick palm, is a species of plant in the palm family Arecaceae. It is native to the Wet Tropics bioregion of Queensland, Australia.

== Description ==
Linospadix apetiolatus is a small palm with a clustering habit that can reach up to 5 m (16 ft) in height. It may flower from 2 m (6 ft 7 in), and it has a stem about 2.5 cm (0.98 in) thick. The leaves are usually divided into two large segments (rarely more), and the petiole (leaf stalk) varies from none to 2 cm (0.79 in) long. Flowers are produced on a pendant spike up to 60 cm (24 in) long, carrying both male and female flowers. The fruits are red or yellow drupes, somewhat ellipsoid or cylindrical, measuring about 15 mm (0.59 in) long and 9 mm (0.35 in) wide.

== Distribution and habitat ==
The species is endemic to northeast Queensland and grows in rainforest on Mount Lewis and Mount Spurgeon (the highlands west of Port Douglas), at altitudes from 400 to 1,300 m (1,300 to 4,300 ft).

== Taxonomy ==
The species was first described in 1997 by Australian botanists John Leslie Dowe & Anthony Kyle Irvine. Their paper, titled "A revision of Linospadix in Australia, with the description of a new species" was published in the journal Principes (now published as Palms).

== Conservation ==
This species is listed as least concern under the Queensland Government's Nature Conservation Act. As of 24 October 2025, it has not been assessed by the International Union for Conservation of Nature (IUCN).
