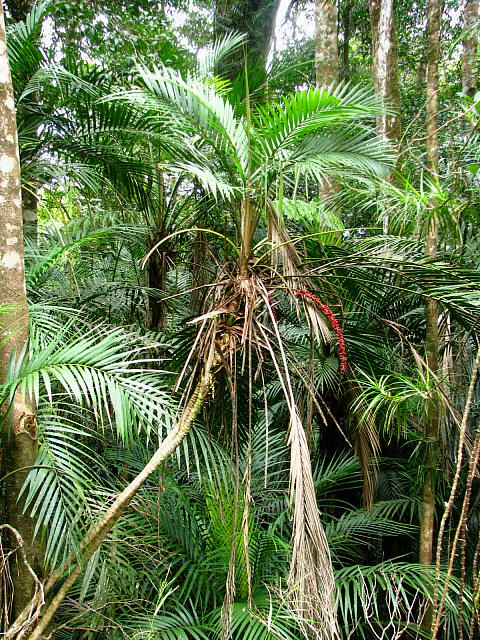
- In the Herberton Range National Park

Scientific classification
- Kingdom: Plantae
- Clade: Tracheophytes
- Clade: Angiosperms
- Clade: Monocots
- Clade: Commelinids
- Order: Arecales
- Family: Arecaceae
- Subfamily: Arecoideae
- Tribe: Areceae
- Subtribe: Linospadicinae
- Genus: Laccospadix; H.Wendl. & Drude
- Species: L. australasicus

Binomial name
- Laccospadix australasicus H.Wendl. & Drude

Synonyms
- Calyptrocalyx australasicus (H.Wendl. & Drude) Hook.f.; Ptychosperma laccospadix Benth.; Calyptrocalyx laccospadix F.M.Bailey

= Laccospadix =

Genus of flowering plants

Laccospadix is a monotypic genus—i.e. a genus that contains only one species—in the palm family Arecaceae. The sole described species is Laccospadix australasicus, commonly called Atherton palm or mountain mist palm, which is endemic to Queensland, Australia.

== Description ==
Laccospadix australasicus is a small feather-leaved palm that may be solitary or clustering, in the former the trunks will grow to around 10 cm (3.9 in) diameter while clustering plants are closer to 5 cm (2.0 in). The trunks may be dark green to almost black at the base, lightening with age, and conspicuously ringed by leaf scars. They will reach up to 8 m (26 ft) in height while the suckering varieties grow to about 3.5 m (11 ft). They have six to eight pinnate leaves emerging erect with a slight arch, reaching up to 2.5 m (8 ft 2 in) long. The leaflets are long and narrow with pointed tips, glossy green above and paler underneath, and they reach up to 40 cm (16 in) long by 4 cm (1.6 in) wide.

The inflorescence is an unbranched spike up to 2 m (6 ft 7 in) long, emerging from within the leaf crown. It carries both pistillate (functionally female) and staminate (functionally male) flowers, both with three petals and three sepals. The fruit is a red, slightly ovoid drupe about 16 mm (0.6 in) long and 8 mm (0.3 in) wide. It has a smooth epicarp and a thin fleshy mesocarp and contains a single yellowish seed about 12 mm (0.5 in) long.

== Distribution and habitat ==
It is found in eastern Queensland between Cooktown and Townsville, at altitudes from 100 to 1,600 m (330 to 5,250 ft). It inhabits mountain rainforest, where it grows as an understory plant, most often on granite-based soils.
