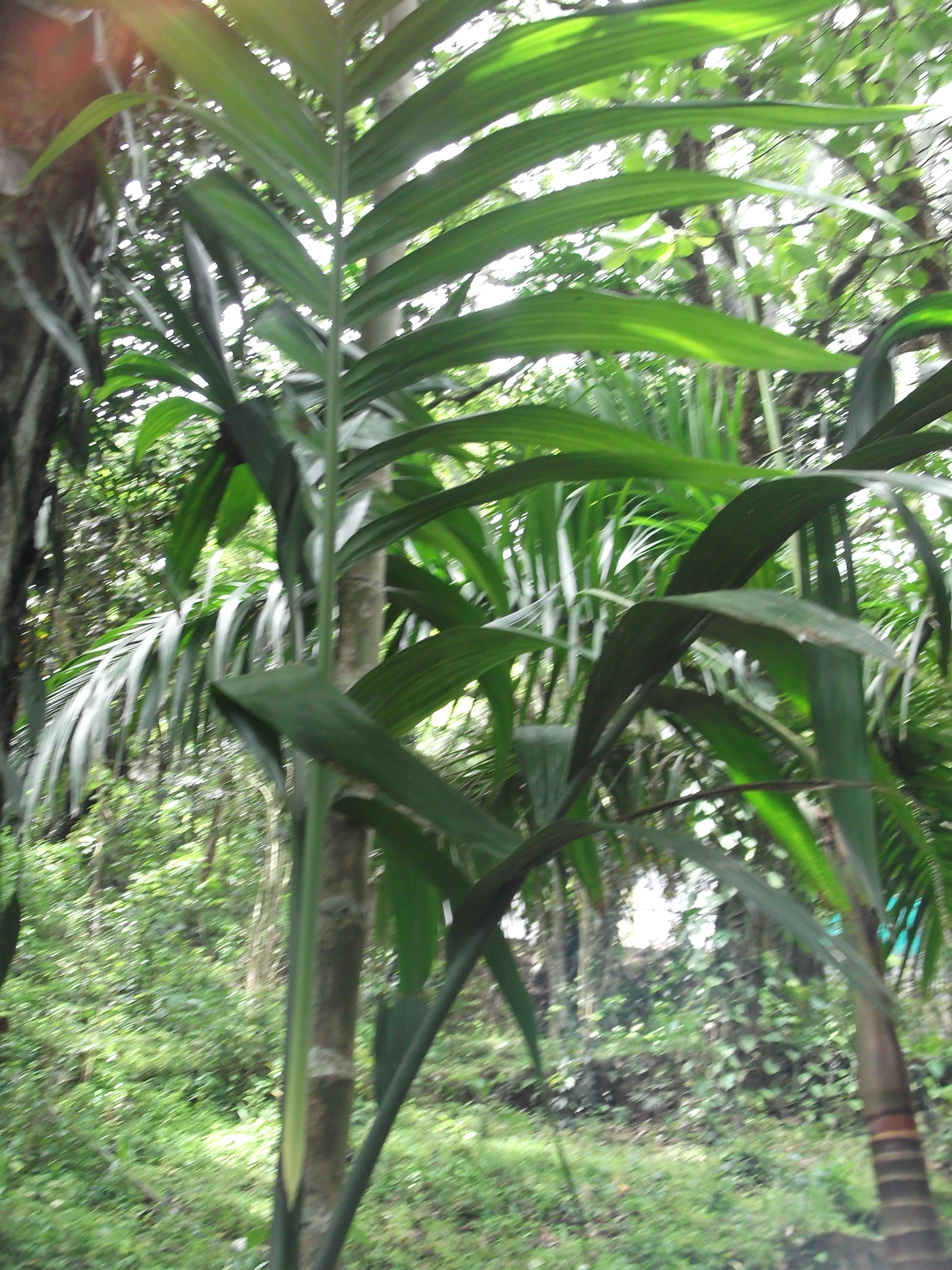
- Bentinckia nicobarica at the Botanical Survey of India's National Orchidarium and Experimental Garden (NOEG) in Yercaud, Tamil Nadu

Conservation status
- Endangered (IUCN 2.3)

Scientific classification
- Kingdom: Plantae
- Clade: Tracheophytes
- Clade: Angiosperms
- Clade: Monocots
- Clade: Commelinids
- Order: Arecales
- Family: Arecaceae
- Genus: Bentinckia
- Species: B. nicobarica

Binomial name
- Bentinckia nicobarica (Kurz) Becc.

Synonyms
- Orania nicobarica Kurz

= Bentinckia nicobarica =

Species of flowering plant

Bentinckia nicobarica is a species of flowering plant in the palm family Arecaceae. It is native to lowland tropical forests of the Andaman and Nicobar Islands in the Bay of Bengal, where it occurs mainly in the Nicobar Islands and in parts of the southern Andaman Islands. Owing to its restricted range, small and fragmented populations and continuing habitat loss it is assessed as an Endangered species on the IUCN Red List.

The species is sometimes known in English as the Nicobar palm.

== Taxonomy ==
The species was first described as Orania nicobarica by Wilhelm Sulpiz Kurz in 1875, based on material from the Nicobar Islands, and was transferred to the genus Bentinckia by Odoardo Beccari in 1885. The genus Bentinckia is endemic to India and comprises two species, B. condapanna from the southern Western Ghats and B. nicobarica from the Andaman and Nicobar Islands.

A recent lectotypification has clarified the application of the basionym Orania nicobarica to Bentinckia nicobarica and stabilised its nomenclature.

== Distribution and habitat ==
Bentinckia nicobarica is native to the Nicobar and southern Andaman Islands in the eastern Indian Ocean. Floristic and conservation studies treat it as restricted chiefly to the Nicobar group, where it has been recorded from islands including Great Nicobar, Katchal, Nancowry, Camorta, Trinkat and neighbouring small islands. Field observations and herbarium records also document populations in parts of the South Andaman district, and recent botanical treatments list the species as native from the South Andaman Islands to the Nicobar Islands.

The palm grows in lowland tropical rainforest, typically on steep slopes, along stream valleys and on the margins of grassy clearings in evergreen forest, from near sea level to a few hundred metres in elevation. It is often found growing together with other palms such as Areca catechu, Pinanga manii and Rhopaloblaste augusta.

== Description ==
Bentinckia nicobarica is a solitary, monoecious palm reaching about 20 m in height, occasionally taller, with a slender, erect stem about 25 cm in diameter. The trunk is pale grey to whitish and ringed with leaf scars. The crown consists of arching, pinnate leaves borne above a relatively long, light green to yellow-green crownshaft.

The inflorescences are branched and emerge from below the crownshaft. The small cream-coloured flowers are spirally arranged along the axes. The fruits are globose, turning dark purplish to black when ripe, about 1 cm in diameter, each containing a single seed that is grooved on one side.

The stems are used locally by Nicobarese communities as a building material for houses and fences and as a substitute for timber in small constructions. Traditional utilisation, together with habitat modification, has contributed to the reduction of mature individuals in some localities.

== Conservation ==
Bentinckia nicobarica has a narrow geographic range and occurs in small, scattered subpopulations. IUCN assessments list it as Endangered under criteria C2a, based on its restricted distribution, small total population size and observed and projected decline in the number of mature individuals. The principal threats include habitat loss and degradation through clearing of lowland rainforest for settlements, infrastructure, agriculture and plantations, as well as cyclones and other natural disturbances affecting the Andaman and Nicobar archipelago.

Recent field surveys have reported additional wild subpopulations within its range, but these are small and fragmented and do not alter the overall threatened status of the species. Conservation recommendations include protection of remaining forest habitats, control of grazing and cutting, and monitoring of known populations.

Ex situ conservation efforts have been established in several botanic gardens and field gene banks in India. Living collections of Bentinckia nicobarica are maintained at the Indian Botanic Garden in Howrah, at the Field Gene Bank of the Jawaharlal Nehru Tropical Botanic Garden and Research Institute in Thiruvananthapuram, and at the Dhanikhari Experimental Garden cum Arboretum (DEGCA) in the Andaman and Nicobar Islands.
