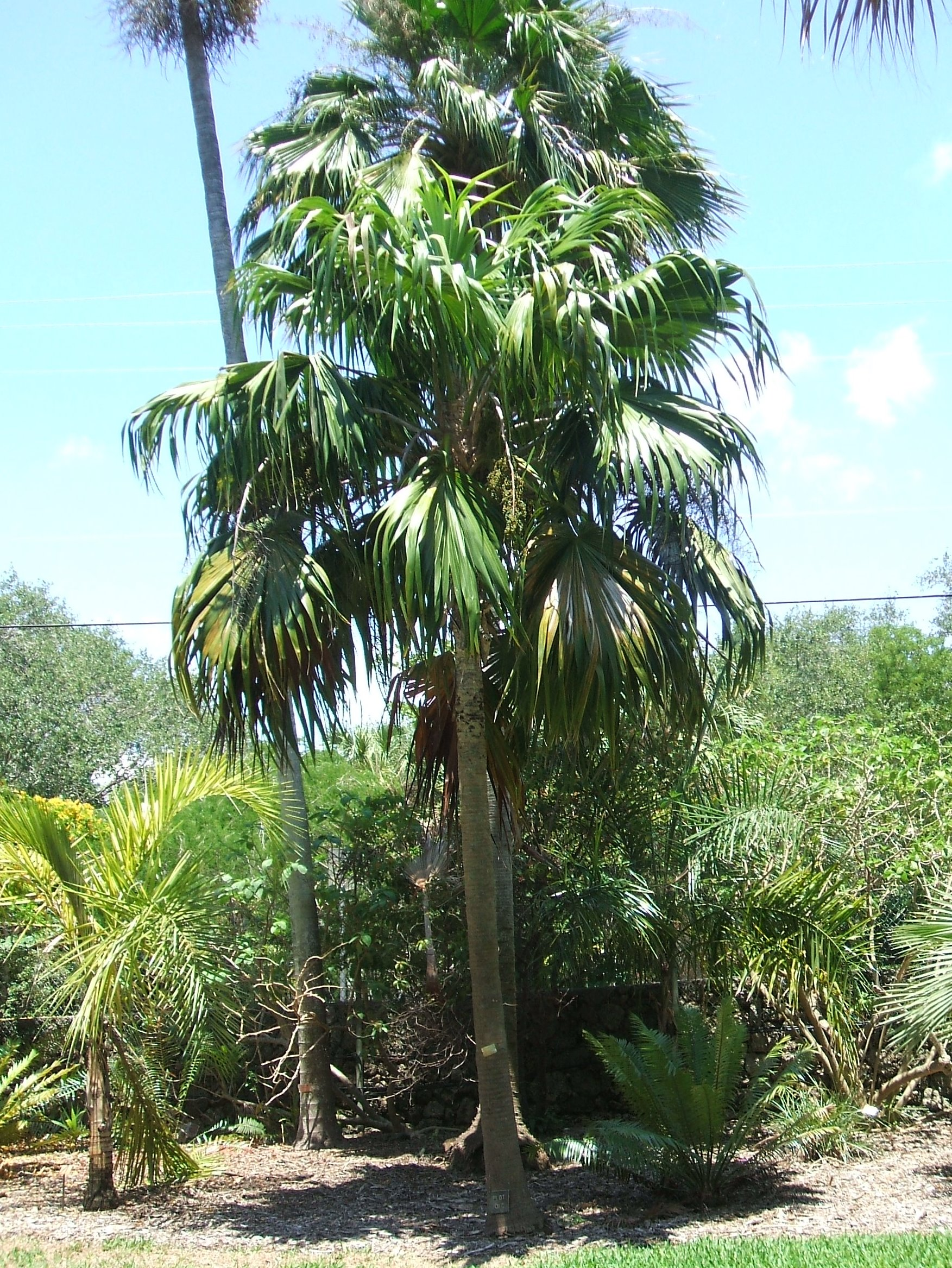
- Thrinax excelsa at Fairchild Tropical Botanic Garden, Coral Gables, Florida, United States

Scientific classification
- Kingdom: Plantae
- Clade: Tracheophytes
- Clade: Angiosperms
- Clade: Monocots
- Clade: Commelinids
- Order: Arecales
- Family: Arecaceae
- Genus: Thrinax
- Species: T. excelsa

Binomial name
- Thrinax excelsa Lodd. ex Mart.

= Thrinax excelsa =

Species of palm

Thrinax excelsa, commonly known as broad thatch, is a species of palm which is endemic to Jamaica.

== Description ==
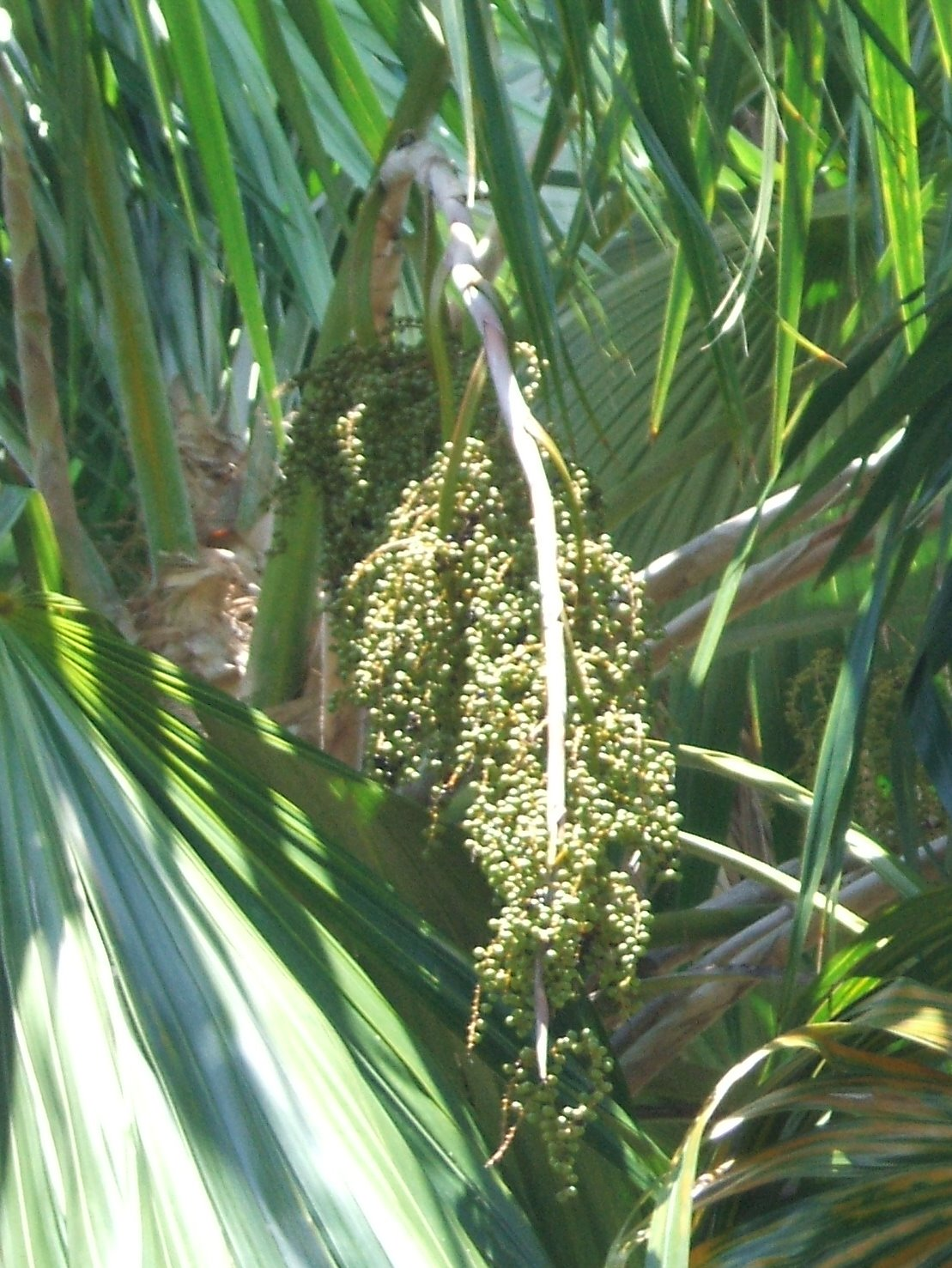
Immature fruit of Thrinax excelsa

Thrinax excelsa is a fan palm with solitary stems that range from 3 to 11 metres (9.8 to 36.1 ft) tall and 12.5 to 20 centimetres (4.9 to 7.9 in) in diameter. Plants have between 6 and 17 palmately compound leaves with 52 to 65 leaflets. The inflorescences are arched and are not longer than the leaves. The bisexual flowers are small. The fruit are small, single-seeded, globose and white when mature.

== Distribution ==
The species is endemic to Jamaica, where it grows between 300 and 500 metres (980 and 1,640 ft) above sea level in the John Crow Mountains.
