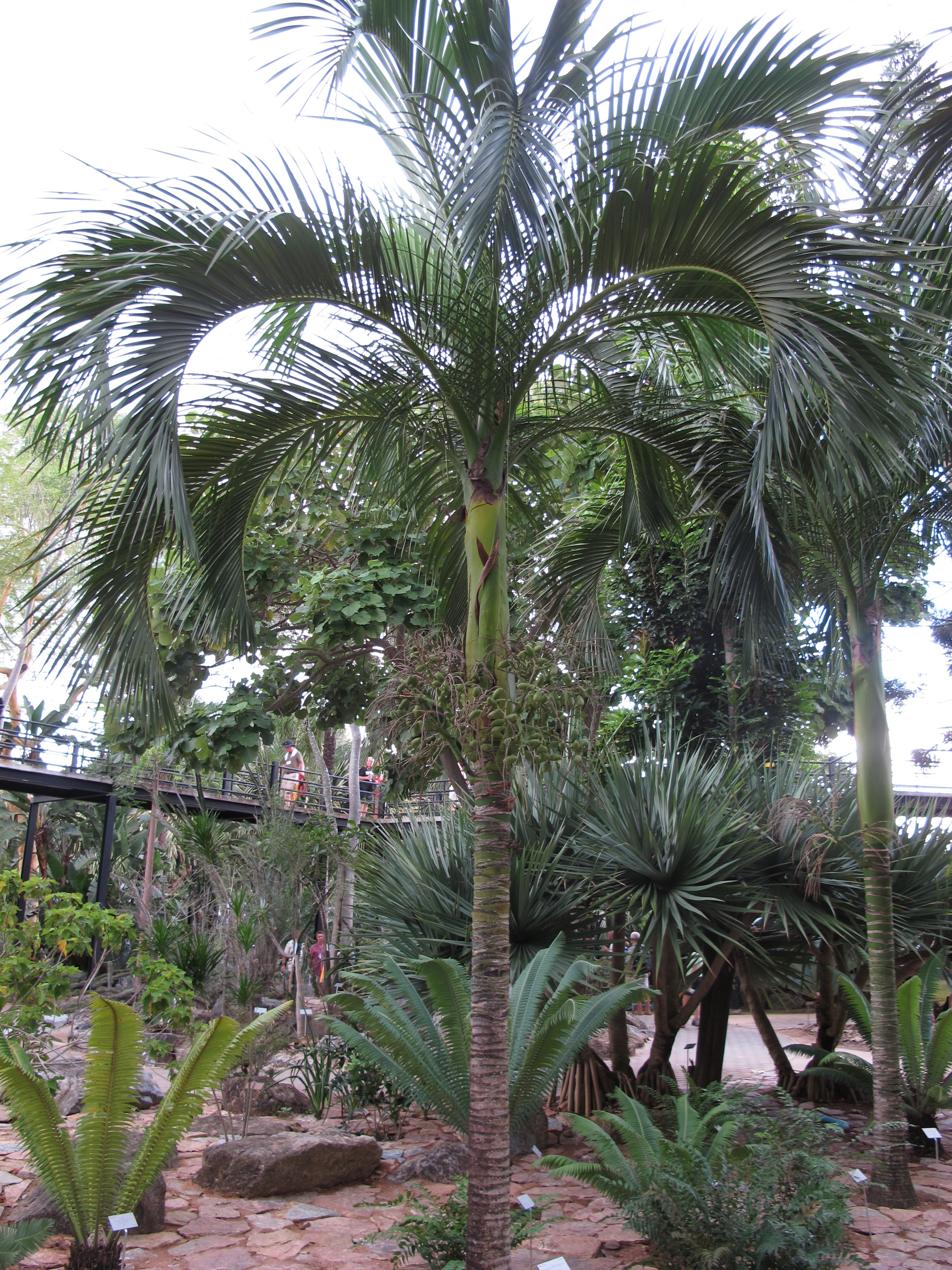

Conservation status
- Critically Endangered (IUCN 2.3)

Scientific classification
- Kingdom: Plantae
- Clade: Tracheophytes
- Clade: Angiosperms
- Clade: Monocots
- Clade: Commelinids
- Order: Arecales
- Family: Arecaceae
- Subfamily: Arecoideae
- Tribe: Areceae
- Subtribe: Carpoxylinae
- Genus: Carpoxylon; H.Wendl. & Drude
- Species: C. macrospermum

Binomial name
- Carpoxylon macrospermum H.Wendl. & Drude

= Carpoxylon =

Genus of palms

Carpoxylon macrospermum is a species of palm tree endemic to Vanuatu, and the only species in the genus Carpoxylon.

It is an IUCN Red List Critically endangered species, threatened by habitat loss.

== Taxonomy ==
This palm was first described by Hermann Wendland and Carl Georg Oscar Drude in 1875 in Linnaea.
