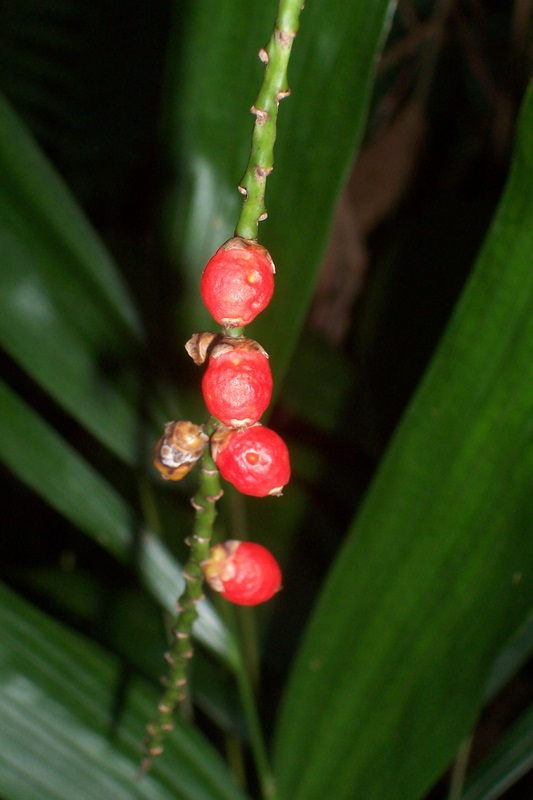
- Walking stick palm in fruit, Nymboi-Binderay National Park, Australia

Scientific classification
- Kingdom: Plantae
- Clade: Tracheophytes
- Clade: Angiosperms
- Clade: Monocots
- Clade: Commelinids
- Order: Arecales
- Family: Arecaceae
- Genus: Linospadix
- Species: L. monostachyos

Binomial name
- Linospadix monostachyos (C.Mart.) H.Wendl.

Synonyms
- Areca monostachya Mart; Bacularia monostachya (Mart.) F.Muell.; Kentia monostachya (Mart.) F.Muell.

= Linospadix monostachyos =

Walking stick palm

Species of palm

Linospadix monostachyos known as the walking stick palm is a small palm growing in rainforest understorey in Queensland and New South Wales.

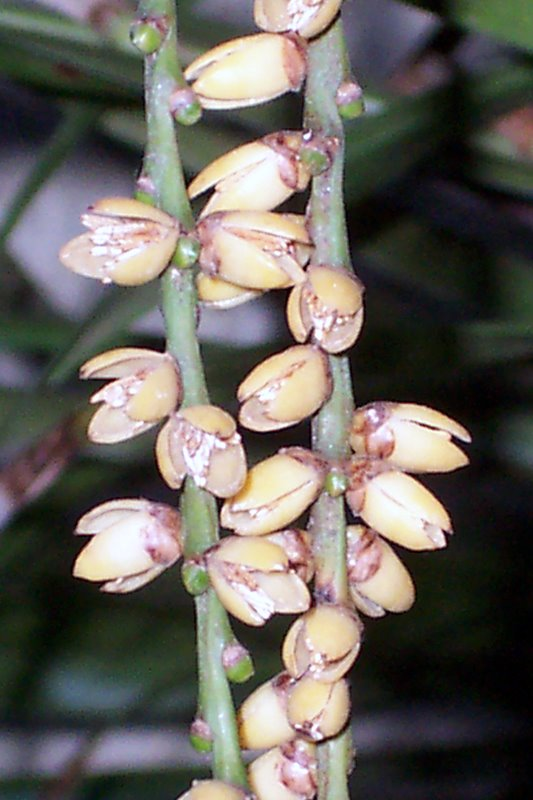
Walking stick palm in flower, Nightcap National Park, Australia
