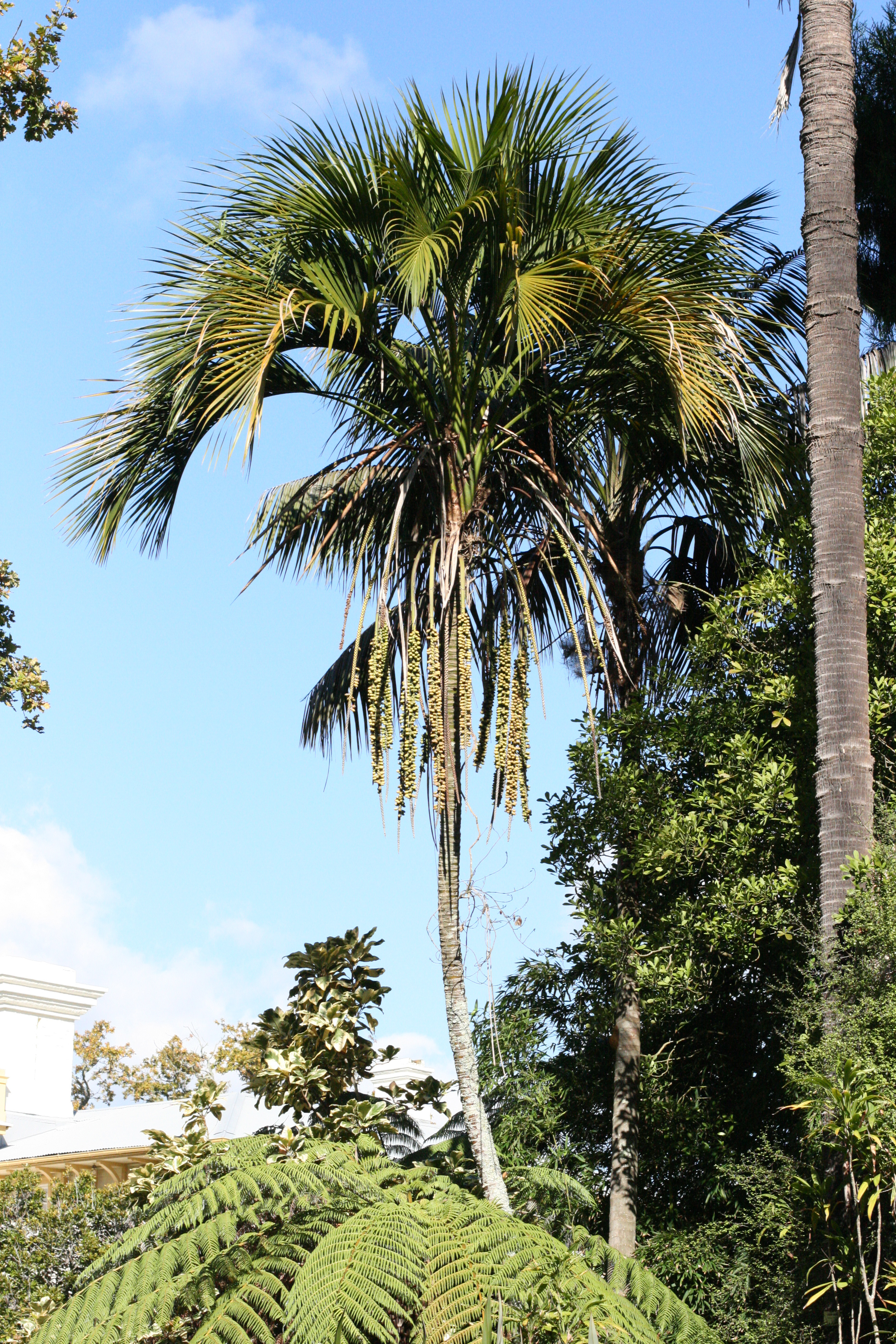
- Howea belmoreana

Conservation status
- Vulnerable (IUCN 2.3)

Scientific classification
- Kingdom: Plantae
- Clade: Tracheophytes
- Clade: Angiosperms
- Clade: Monocots
- Clade: Commelinids
- Order: Arecales
- Family: Arecaceae
- Genus: Howea
- Species: H. belmoreana

Binomial name
- Howea belmoreana (C. Moore & F.Muell.) Becc.
- H. belmoreana is endemic to Lord Howe Island

= Howea belmoreana =

Species of palm

Howea belmoreana, the curly palm, kentia palm, or Belmore sentry palm, is a species of flowering plant in the family Arecaceae, endemic to Lord Howe Island, Australia. It and Howea forsteriana probably evolved from a common ancestor through sympatric speciation. The canopy of a mature kentia palm tree spreads 5–10 ft (2–3 m) in diameter and contains roughly 36 leaves.

Howea belmoreana has gained the Royal Horticultural Society's Award of Garden Merit.

== Effects of mycorrhiza on speciation ==
Howea belmoreana is restricted to the volcanic soils on Lord Howe Island, whereas H. forsteriana is found on both alkaline calcareous and volcanic soils, the two most common soil types found on the island. Howea belmoreana is more common on volcanic soils and has a higher survival rate than H. forsteriana. Osborne et al. (2018) suggest that the speciation of H. forsteriana and Howea belmoreana is partially a result of difference in arbuscular mycorrhiza based on soil types. The levels of arbuscular mycorrhizal fungi were significantly lower in the roots of Howea forsteriana on volcanic soil, compared to the same species on calcareous soil and to Howea belmoreana on the same volcanic soil. The symbiotic relationship between the plant and the fungi exchanges carbons from the plant for essential nutrients such as nitrogen and phosphate that would be otherwise inaccessible to the plant. The decreased fungal relationships in Howea forsteriana in volcanic soil may disadvantage it compared to Howea belmoreana.
