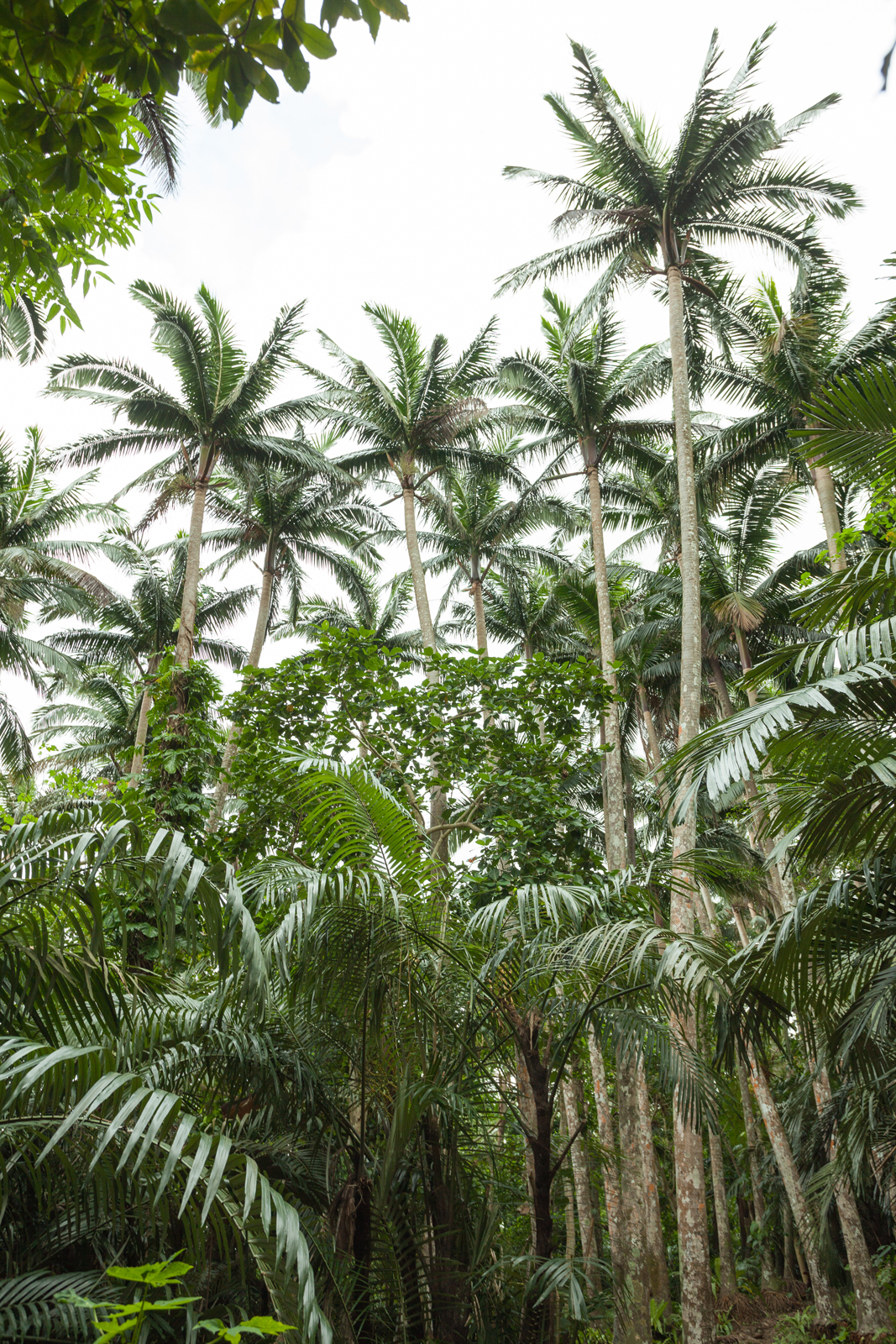

Conservation status
- Data Deficient (IUCN 2.3)

Scientific classification
- Kingdom: Plantae
- Clade: Tracheophytes
- Clade: Angiosperms
- Clade: Monocots
- Clade: Commelinids
- Order: Arecales
- Family: Arecaceae
- Subfamily: Arecoideae
- Tribe: Areceae
- Subtribe: Carpoxylinae
- Genus: Satakentia; H.E.Moore
- Species: S. liukiuensis

Binomial name
- Satakentia liukiuensis (Hatus.) H.E.Moore

Synonyms
- Gulubia liukiuensis Hatus.

= Satakentia =

Genus of palms

Satakentia is a monotypic genus of flowering plants in the palm family, Arecaceae. Satakentia liukiuensis is the sole species in the genus. It is sometimes referred to by the common names satake palm, yaeyama-yashi [Japanese ヤエヤマヤシ], satakentia palm, yaeyama palm, and no-yashi. It is endemic to Ishigaki Island and Iriomote Island in the Yaeyama Islands, the south-westernmost of the Ryukyu Islands, Japan.

The genus and the species were both circumscribed by Harold 'Hal' Emery Moore. The genus name of Satakentia is in honour of Toshihiko Satake (1910–1998), who was a Japanese factory owner (the 2nd President of Satake Corporation), producer of rice-processing equipment and also an expert in Arecaceae.
