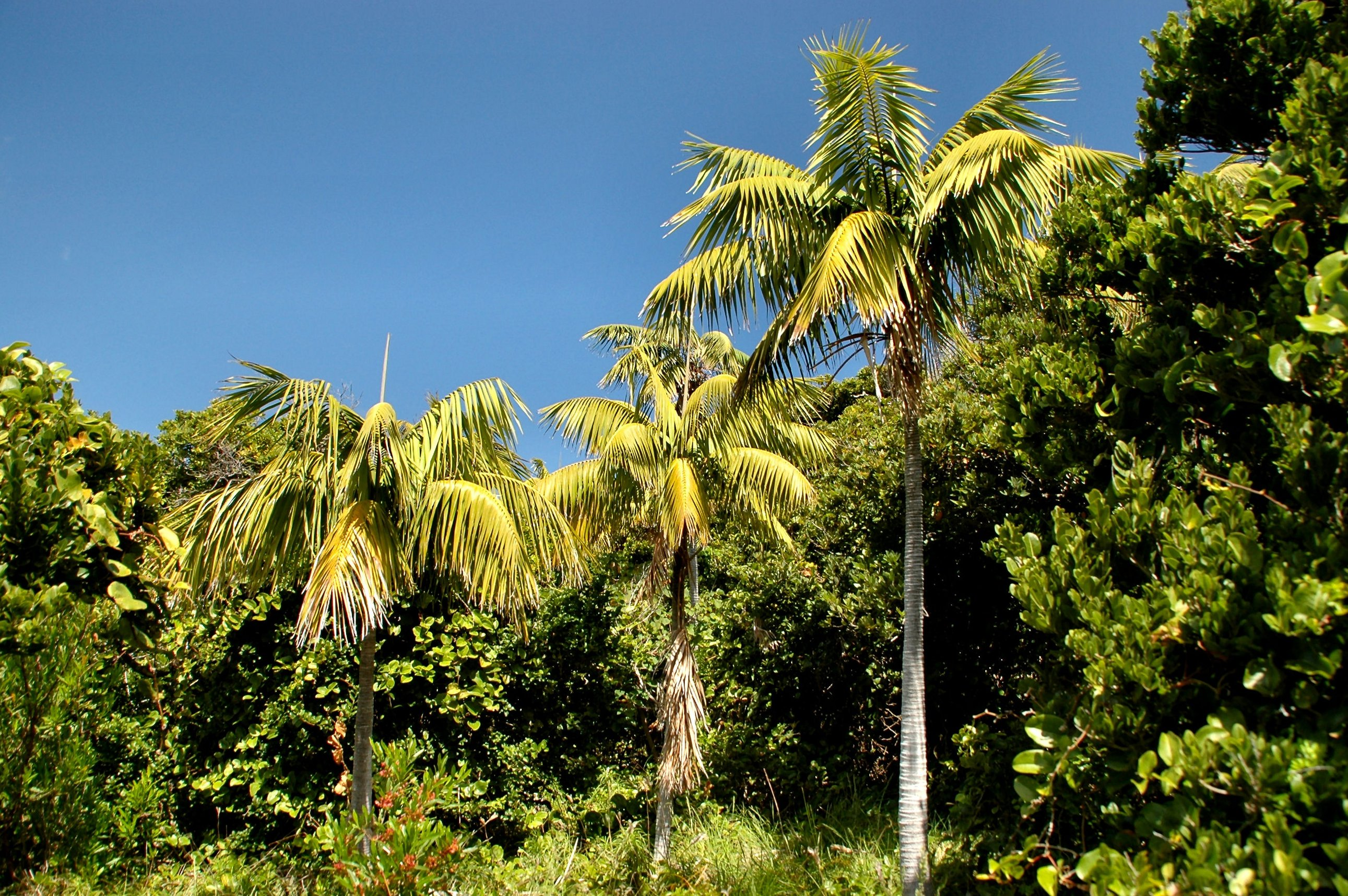
- Howea forsteriana in habitat

Conservation status
- Vulnerable (IUCN 2.3)

Scientific classification
- Kingdom: Plantae
- Clade: Tracheophytes
- Clade: Angiosperms
- Clade: Monocots
- Clade: Commelinids
- Order: Arecales
- Family: Arecaceae
- Genus: Howea
- Species: H. forsteriana

Binomial name
- Howea forsteriana Becc.
- H. forsteriana is endemic to Lord Howe Island

= Howea forsteriana =

Species of palm

Howea forsteriana, the Kentia palm, thatch palm or palm court palm, is a species of flowering plant in the palm family, Arecaceae, endemic to Lord Howe Island in Australia. It is also widely grown on Norfolk Island. It is a relatively slow-growing palm, eventually growing up to 10 m (33 ft) tall by 6 m (20 ft) wide. Its fronds can reach 3 m (10 ft) long. The palm gets its common name from the capital of Lord Howe Island, Kentia, and the genus name, Howea, from the island itself. The species name forsteriana is after Johann Reinhold Forster and Georg Forster, father and son, who accompanied Captain Cook as naturalists on his second voyage to the Pacific in 1772–1775. The seeds require six years to mature.

The species is considered vulnerable by the World Conservation Union. It is cultivated on Lord Howe Island by collecting wild seeds and germinating them for export worldwide as an ornamental garden or houseplant. The trade in the seeds and seedlings is tightly regulated. This plant has gained the Royal Horticultural Society's Award of Garden Merit.

== History ==
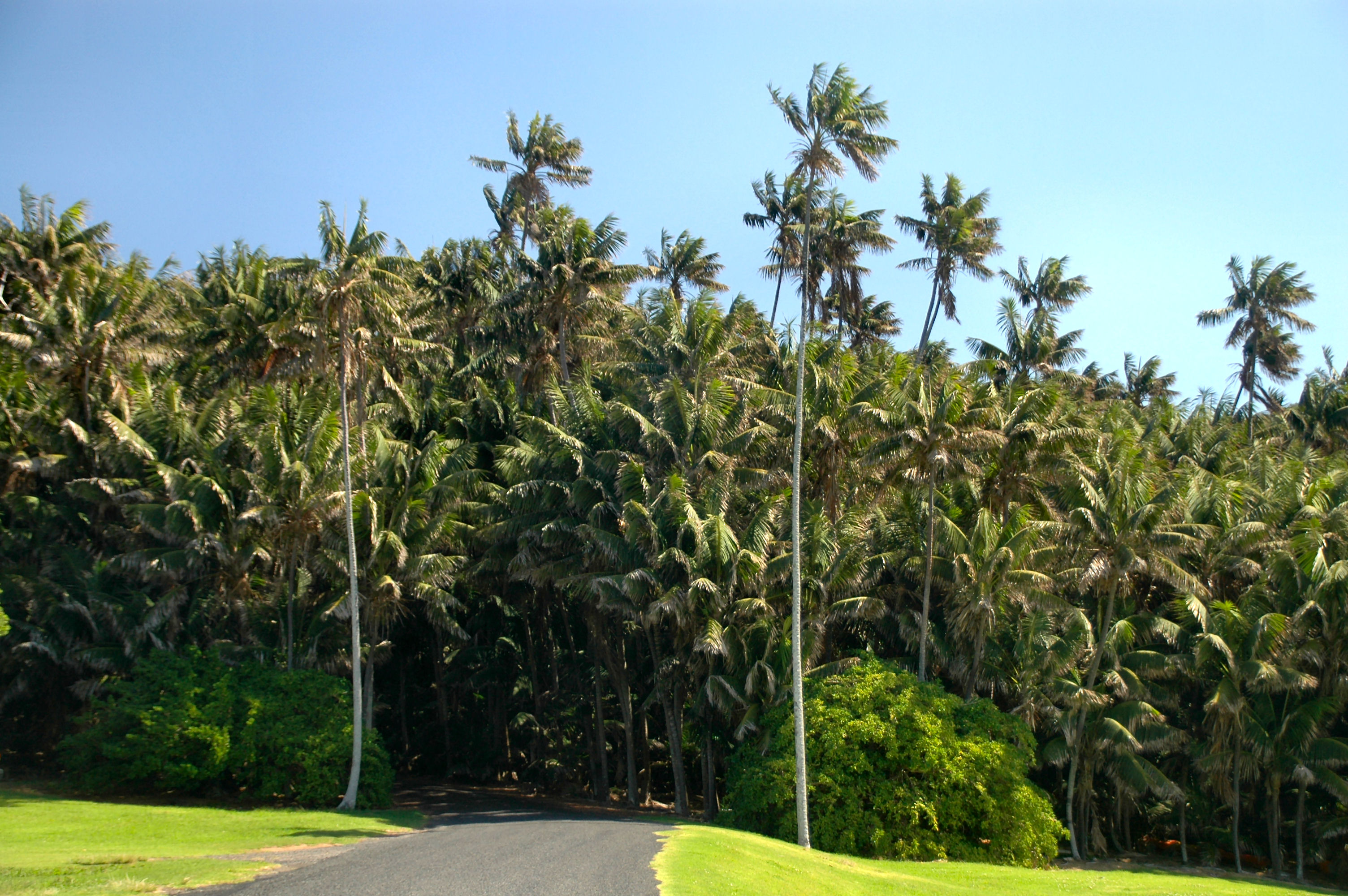
Tall H. forsteriana growing in the forest at Neds Beach, Lord Howe Island

Howea forsteriana gained great popularity as a houseplant in Europe and the United States during the Victorian era, at a time when exotic palms and other plants were avidly collected in England and elsewhere. The Kentia became the quintessential 'parlour palm' beginning in the 1870s, when seed exports from Lord Howe Island first started. In part this was because the plant thrived in interiors where low light, low humidity, poor air quality and cool temperatures made palms otherwise impossible to grow. One of the earliest growers were the De Clerc family in Belgium, who remained one of the dominant growers of the palm in Europe for the next century.

By 1885 the palm had achieved preeminence in Britain, where the Journal of Horticulture commented that: "These Kentias are in greater demand than almost any other palm on account of their great beauty and enduring properties". Another reason for their popularity is attributable to Queen Victoria, who cultivated them in all of her homes and left instructions for Kentia palms to be placed around her coffin while she lay in state. The association with royalty and the fact that Kentias were quite expensive to buy gave those who could furnish their homes with them a certain prestige.

The Palm Courts which became popular in Edwardian hotels like those of The Ritz Hotel in London or the Plaza Hotel in New York all featured Kentia palms, aesthetically pleasing because of their architectural, drooping fronds and the great height they reach at maturity. They continue to be used in such contexts, being a plant of choice for modern hotel lobbies, casinos, and shopping malls. One of the first class facilities of RMS Titanic, such as the Verandah Café (a palm court), had featured a number of potted Kentia palms.

During the Edwardian era, around 4 million seeds were harvested annually on Lord Howe Island to satisfy the market for Kentias. In 1912, a Judicial Royal Commission was formed in Australia to investigate the cultivation and marketing of the palm on the island. At the beginning of the 21st century, production of Kentia palm seeds globally stood at between 30 and 40 million.

== Cultivation ==
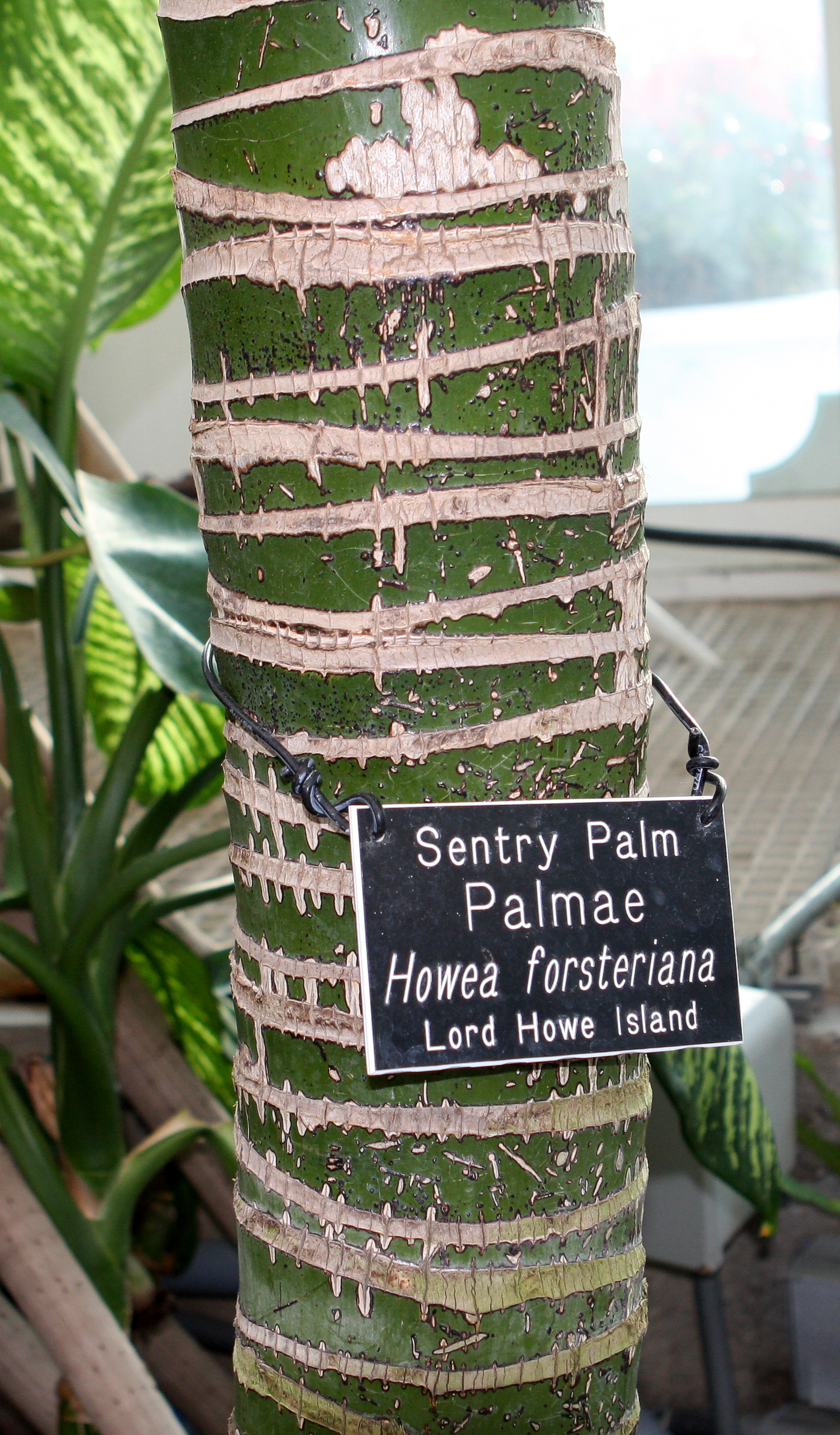
Tall H. forsteriana showing stem detail.

The palm is an elegant plant, and is popular for growing indoors, requiring little light. Out of doors, it prefers a tropical region but will also grow in a cooler climate, and can tolerate temperatures down to -5 °C, but only for a few hours; normal temperatures should not go below 10 °C. It grows readily outside in areas such as southern Australia and northern New Zealand, where it is fairly common in private gardens or as a street tree.

In the Northern Hemisphere, it can be grown as far north as southwest England, and grows well in the south of Spain and the southern United States, and will bear flowers and fruit. The coasts of the southeastern Azores and Madeira offer climates similar to its original habitat. It is slow growing, but will eventually reach heights of 6 to 18 metres. Under natural conditions, it grows as a solitary tree. Germination of the seeds is erratic.

The closely related Belmore sentry palm (Howea belmoreana), also endemic on Lord Howe Island, is a smaller species to 7 metres tall, found mainly as an understorey plant in moist forests.

A potted Kentia palm sold in modern-day garden centers generally does not consist of one palm but two to five, planted in clusters as seedlings to give the plant a shrubbier look. They remain relatively expensive to purchase, because the export of seeds from Lord Howe Island is strictly controlled, the germination rate for seeds is low, and the plant is a slow grower, requiring years of nurturing to reach saleable size. In Europe Kentias are primarily nursery-grown in Holland and then sold throughout the continent. They are more popular, less expensive, and easier to purchase in European countries than they are in the United States, where much of the commercial growing is done in Hawaii before plants are brought to the mainland.

=== Care ===
As potted plants Kentias are fairly tolerant of neglect: they can withstand low-light conditions, low humidity, infrequent watering and cool temperatures. However, it is advisable to give Kentias bright, indirect light to encourage growth and a more robust appearance; Kentias placed in dark corners with little natural light tend to look leggy and grow very slowly. In the northern hemisphere, a northern or northeastern window is best, as greenhouse-grown Kentias cannot tolerate direct sun and will sunburn if placed in such an exposure.

The roots are very sensitive to disturbance, so gardeners should only repot Kentias after they have become extremely root bound in their existing pot, and even then should take special care. They appreciate regular water but should be allowed to dry out between waterings. Overwatering, or allowing the roots to sit in water, can induce root rot and kill the palm. An indoor houseplant fertilizer should be applied regularly in the spring and summer to encourage growth.

If used indoors, the fronds should be misted three times a week with rainwater to raise the humidity levels and keep the fronds looking green and healthy.
