= Kundasang =

Hill station and town in Sabah, Malaysia

- Hill Station cum Sub-district of Ranau
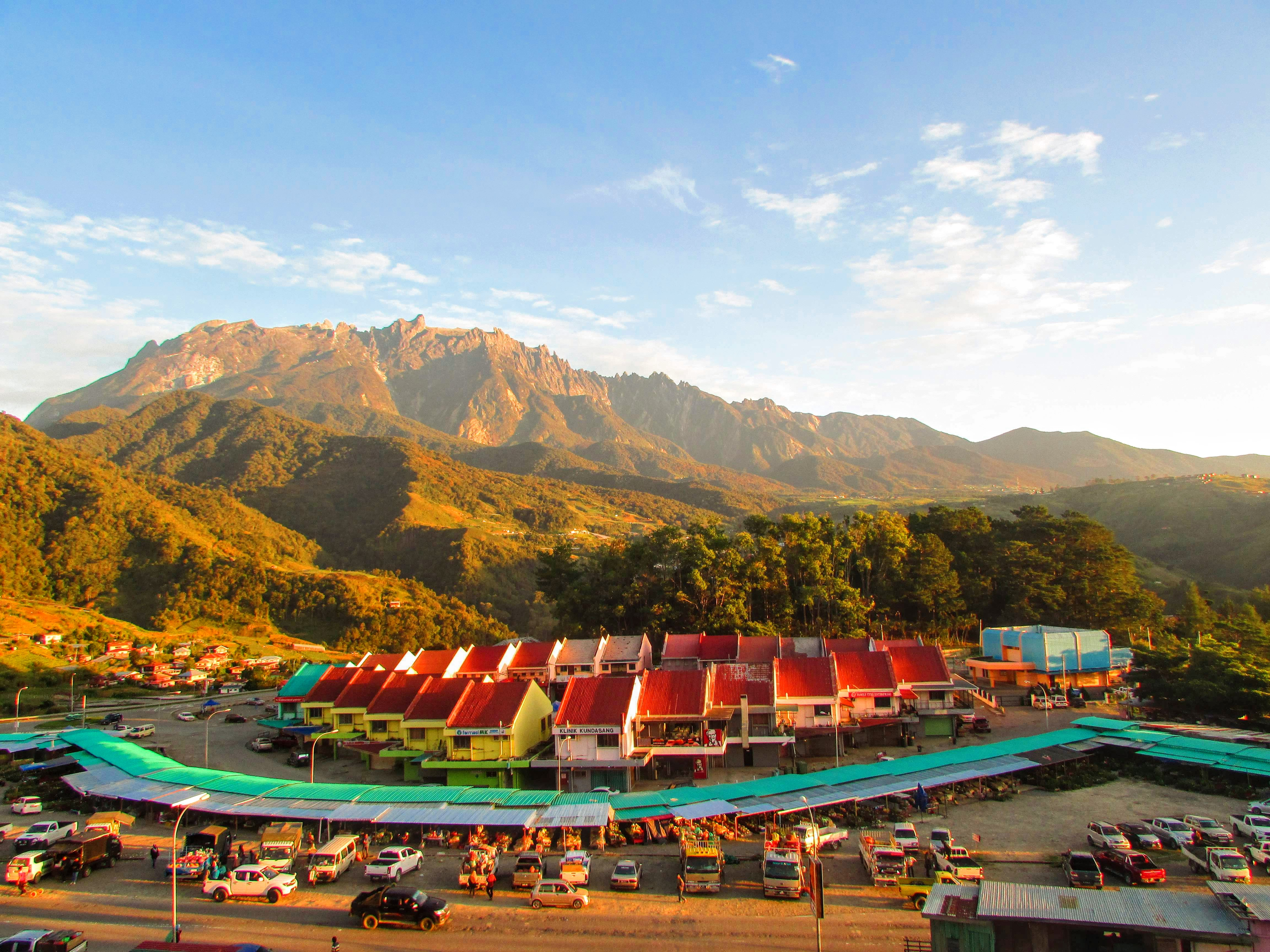
- Rows of shoplots in Kundasang town.

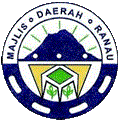
- Seal

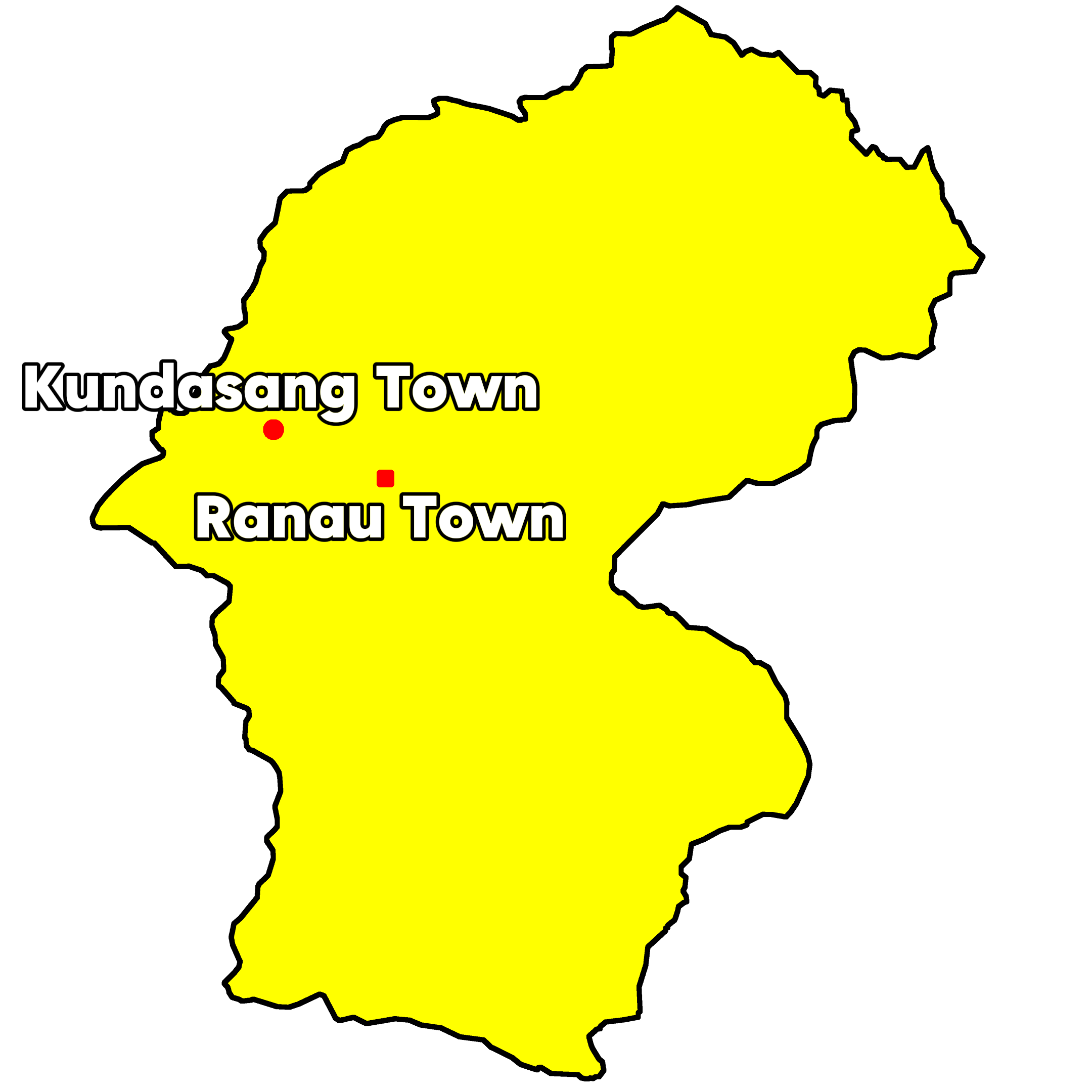
- Location of Kundasang Town in Ranau District

- Location within Borneo
- Coordinates: 5°59′N 116°34′E
- Country: Malaysia
- State: Sabah
- Division: West Coast
- District: Ranau
- Subdistrict: Kundasang: 1. Nalapak; 2. Paginatan; 3. Kundasang; 4. Liwagu; 5. Lipasu; 6. Tagudon; 7. Karanaan; 8. Lohan; 9. Bongkud; 10. Timbua; 11. Malinsau; 12. Kaingaran; 13. Randagong

Government
  - DUN: Joachim Gunsalam (GRS-PBS) (Kundasang); Masidi Manjun (GRS-Gagasan) (Karanaan)
- Elevation: 1,900 m (6,200 ft)
- Highest elevation: 4,095 m (13,435 ft)

Population (2023)
  - Total: ~10,000
- Time zone: GMT +08:00
- Weekly Market: Friday

Kundasang is a hill station and town in the district of Ranau in Sabah, Malaysia that lies along the bank of Kundasang Valley within the Crocker Range, which neighbours Pekan Nabalu in nearby Kota Belud district. It is located about 6 kilometres away from Kinabalu National Park, 15.6 kilometres from Ranau town centre proper and is renowned for its vegetable market which is open seven days a week. It is the closest town to Mount Kinabalu and has a panoramic view of the mountain. It is populated mainly by the native Ranau Dusuns who are mostly Muslims since the colonial rule with a large significant Christian minority (especially in the Bundu Tuhan village where its native Dusun populace are mostly Roman Catholics owing to Christianisation of the tribe during colonial rule from animism by the Mill Hill Missionaries in today's Archdiocese of Kota Kinabalu although the vast majority of Christian Dusuns in Ranau are from the Sidang Injil Borneo church) and a small population of Chinese people (mostly Hakkas including those of Sino-Native descent). Notably, almost all the shops are operated by locals.

At an elevation of almost 1,900 m (6,200 ft), it is the highest settlement in Malaysia. Kundasang is also famously known as the New Zealand of Borneo for its unique mountainous geographical terrain almost similar to New Zealand. The Desa Dairy Farm is located within Kundasang.

Mountain in Kundasang.

== Attractions ==
=== Kundasang War Memorial and Gardens ===
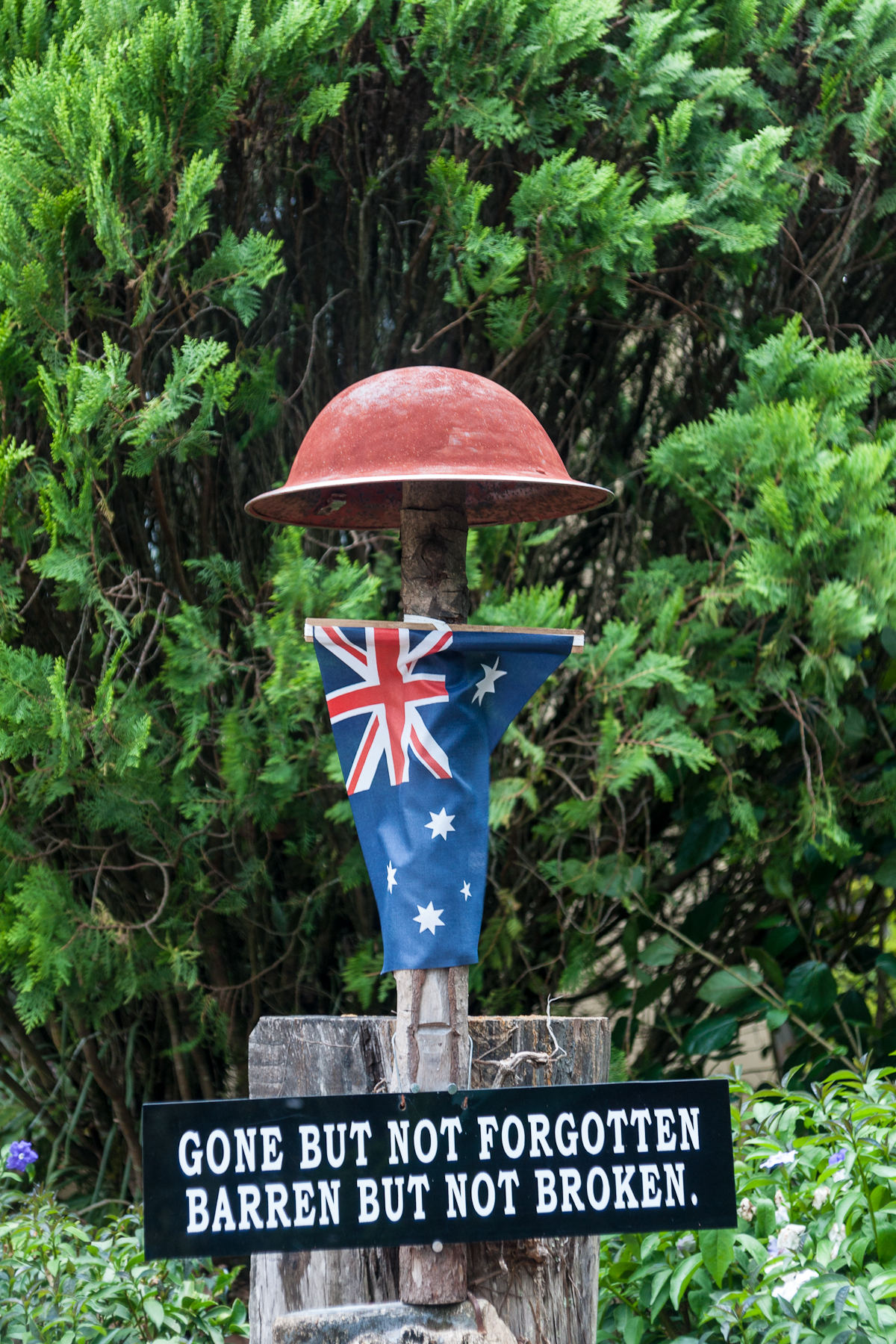
A memorial for the Australian Army during the Death Marches in Kundasang War Memorial.

Kundasang War Memorial commemorates the 2,428 Australian and British prisoners who died during World War II at the Sandakan POW Camp, and the casualties of the three infamous forced death marches from Sandakan to Ranau. It also serves as a tribute to the many local people who risked their lives while aiding the prisoners of war. It has four gardens representing the homelands of those who died. ANZAC Memorial Services and private Memorial Services are welcomed with prior arrangements. The Memorial is open to visitors with minimal entrance fees charged. An access road with ramp allows easy access for wheelchair users.

=== Vegetable wholesale stalls ===
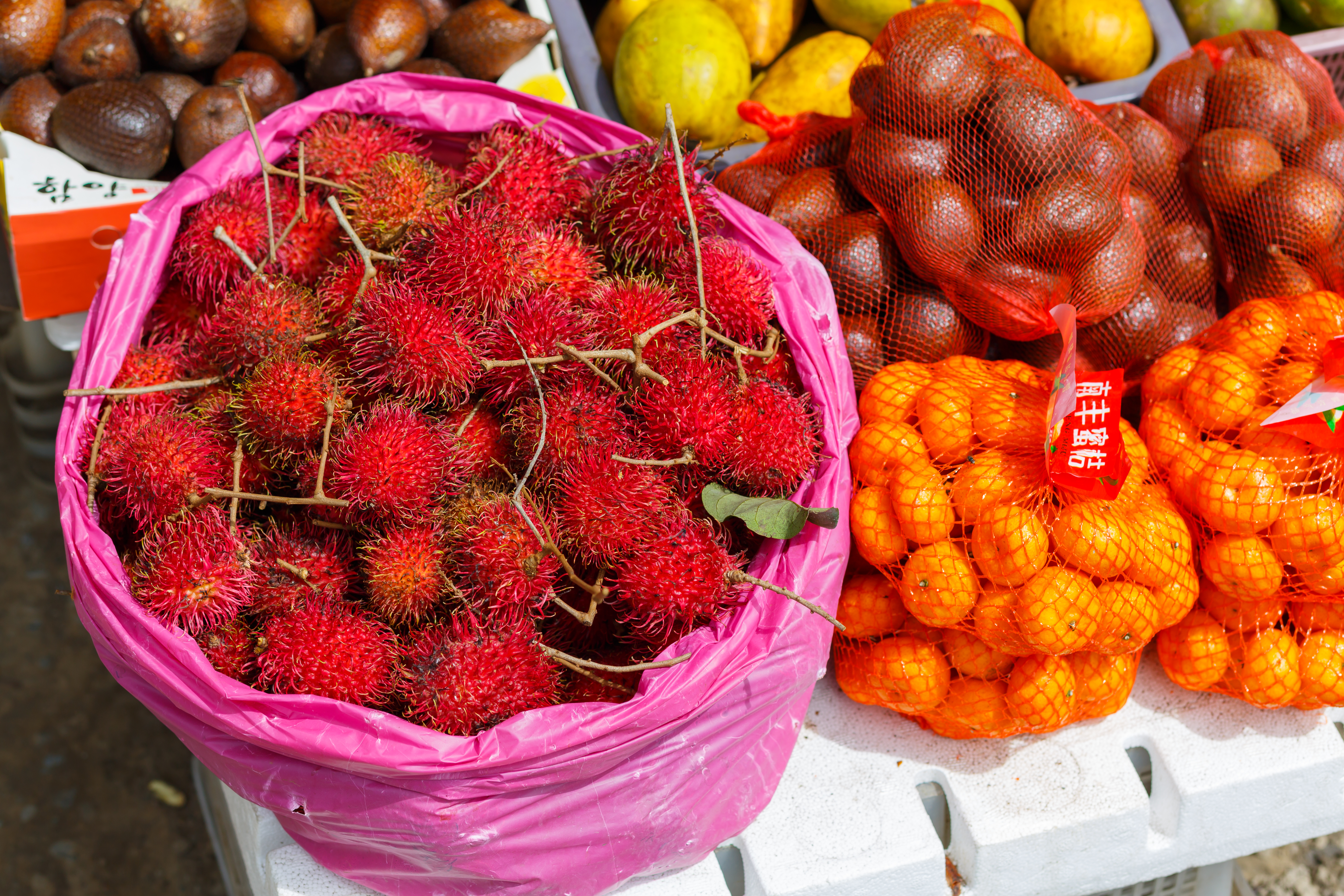
Fruits such as rambutan, salak, oranges and lemons can also be found at the vegetable stalls in Kundasang.

Beside the main road vegetables wholesalers can be found in a long row of wooden stalls (Malay: gerai). Bulk buyers come from all over the state of Sabah, Sarawak and even Brunei for the fresh harvest. Pick up trucks are seen laden fully with harvest from the farms nearby the valley and delivered to the stalls. Passing tourists and travellers also stop by the road for shopping at a good bargain with the stalls are open seven days a week.

=== Golf course ===
Mount Kinabalu Golf Club is located near the border of Kinabalu National Park at an altitude of approximately 2,000 metres above sea level.

== Villages ==
There are several small villages in Kundasang.

No	Village names
1	Kundasang Town (Main hub)
2	Kampung Lembah Permai
3	Kampung Cinta Mata
4	Kampung Kauluan
5	Kampung Mesilou
6	Kampung Mentoki
7	Kampung Bambangan
8	Kampung Desa Aman
9	Kampung Kinasaraban
10	Kampung Bundu Tuhan
11	Kampung Dumpiring
12	Kampung Desa Sunyi (Kundasang Lama)
13	Kampung Mohimboyon
14	Kampung Nosorob
15	Kampung Pinousok
16	Kampung Giman
17	Kampung Sinisian
18	Kampung Ratau
19	Kampung Karanaan
20	Kampung Kituntul
21	Kampung Lapai
22	Kampung Sinar
23	Kampung Liwagu
24	Kampung Muhibah
25	Kampung Kinandusan
26	Kampung Kiwawoi
27	Kampung Waang
28	Kampung Semuruh
29	Kampung Sosondoton
30	Kampung Tudan
31	Kampung Tinatasan

== Education ==
There are 13 primary schools and 2 secondary schools in Kundasang.

No	School Names	Types of School
1	SK Kundasang	Elementary
2	SK Mesilou	Elementary
3	SK Don Bosco	Elementary
4	SK Bundu Tuhan	Elementary
5	SK Kinasaraban	Elementary
7	SK Kauluan	Elementary
8	SK Lipasu	Elementary
9	SK Mohimboyon	Elementary
10	SK Waang	Elementary
11	SK Pahu Himbaan	Elementary
12	SK Tagudon Lama	Elementary
13	SK Pinausuk	Elementary
14	SMK Kundasang	Secondary
15	SMK Bundu Tuhan	Secondary

== See also ==
- Nabalu (town)
- Kinabalu Park
