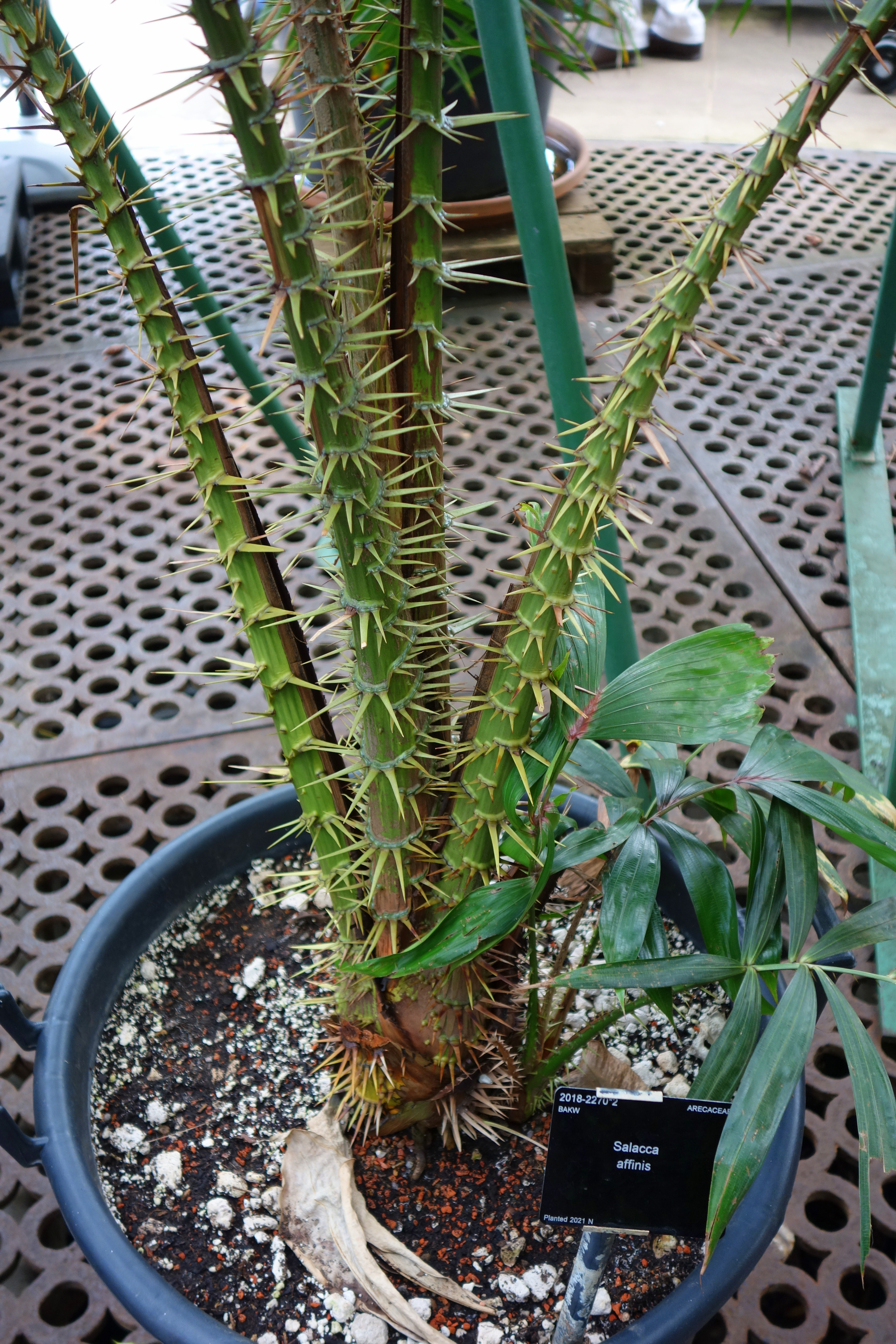
- Stem and leaflets of Salacca affinis

Scientific classification
- Kingdom: Plantae
- Clade: Tracheophytes
- Clade: Angiosperms
- Clade: Monocots
- Clade: Commelinids
- Order: Arecales
- Family: Arecaceae
- Genus: Salacca
- Species: S. affinis

Binomial name
- Salacca affinis Griff. (1845)

Synonyms
- Salacca affinis var. borneensis (Becc.) Furtado; Salacca borneensis Becc.; Salacca dubia Becc.

= Salacca affinis =

Species of plant

Salacca affinis, also known as red salak, red snakefruit salak, red snakefruit, buah ridan salak, buah ridan, linsum, salak hutan, buah manau, kelubi, buah rotan, and ridan, is a flowering shrub in the family Arecaceae. The specific epithet (affinis) comes from Latin "ad finis", meaning "at the boundary", and refers to its resemblance with the congener species Salacca zalacca.

== Distribution ==
Salacca affinis is native to Singapore, Peninsular Malaysia, Borneo, Java, and Sumatra, and occurs in the understory of rainforests, especially near ponds and swamps.

== Description ==
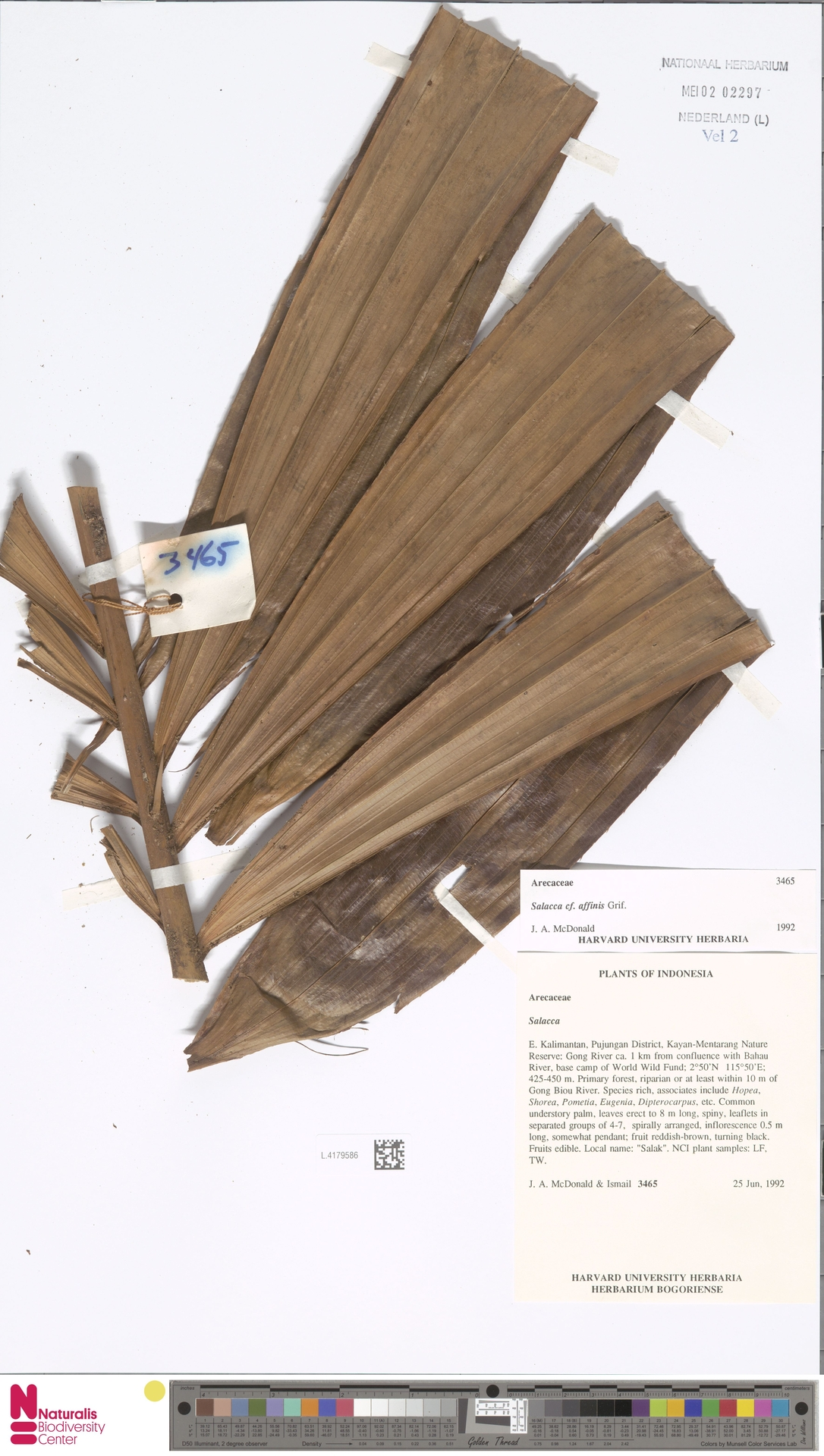
Preserved leaves of Salacca affinis

It is a dioecious, acaulescent, and cespitose plant, and forms large, spiny tufts. The stems are usually underground or creeping, but can measure up to 1–2 meters (3.3–6.6 feet) in height. The petioles measure up to 1 meter in length and are covered in yellow-orange to brown spines, which measure up to 10 centimeters in length and occur in clusters of 2–4. The leaves are pale green, pinnate, and measure up to 60 centimeters (24 inches) in length and 6 centimeters (2.4 inches) in width. They are lanceolate in shape and drooping. The rachis are covered in irregularly arranged spines, similar to the petioles. The topmost leaves have toothed, almost torn tips. The inflorescences are axillary and are subtended by leafy bracts. The male inflorescences measure 50–100 centimeters (20–39 inches) in length and are ramified and have elongated and flattened spines bearing male flowers on cylindrical rachillae shaped like an ear. The single flower measures 4–6 centimeters (1.6–2.4 inches) in length. Female inflorescences are shorter than males ones, measuring up to 5 centimeters (2.0 inches) in length, and are ramified with female flowers borne on rachillae shaped like an ear. Female flowers measure up to 3 centimeters (1.2 inches) in length. The fruit is somewhat ovate in shape, measuring 8 centimeters (3.1 inches) in length and 4 centimeters (1.6 inches) in width, and is tapered at both ends. They are red when ripe and have smooth scales, hence the name "snakefruit". It normally contains up to 3 pale yellow to white seeds and takes form at the center of the plant, making them hard to reach due to the abundance of spines. It is edible and is said to have a sour although slightly sweet flavor, somewhat similar to asam paya. The plant reproduces easily and quickly by seed, which has a limited germinability, usually 15 days, on a warm and humid bed at temperatures over 21 °C (70 °F). The plant prefers positions in half shade with high humidity, sheltered from winds, and in zones with an annual rainfall of more than 1,500 millimeters (59 inches). It grows well in well-drained, slightly acidic or neutral soils rich in organic substance. It withstands minimal temperatures of 20 °C (68 °F), although may withstand temperatures below that for very short periods. There are some reports of the plant withstanding temperatures of 5 °C (41 °F), although not without serious damage to the vegetation.

== Uses ==
Salacca affinis is rarely cultivated outside of its native range. Since its spines discourage its cultivation in parks and gardens, it is rarely found in cultivation outside of botanical gardens. Cultivation for fruit is limited as those of Salacca zalacca are superior, although it is sometimes gathered locally and sold in markets.

== Conservation status ==
Salacca affinis is not evaluated by the IUCN. In 2011 it was rediscovered in Singapore in the Nee Soon Swamp Forest, where it was thought to be extinct.

== See also ==
- List of culinary fruits
