= Farm Fresh =

Farm Fresh may refer to:

- Farm Fresh Food & Pharmacy, a grocery store chain in the US state of Virginia
- Farm Fresh (company), a Malaysian dairy products company
- Farm Fresh (band), a Canadian hip hop band
- Farm Fresh Foxies, a women's volleyball team based in the Philippines
