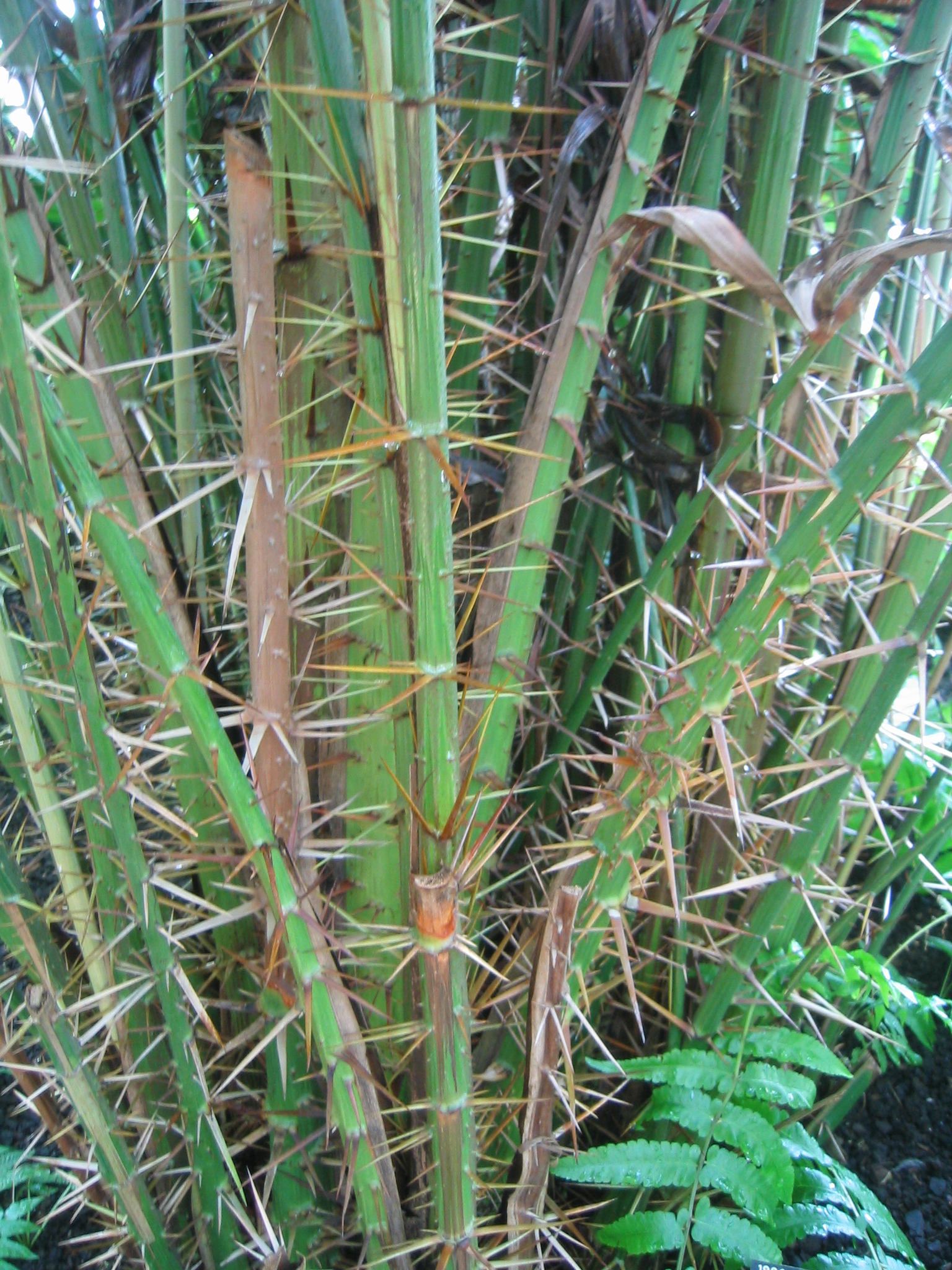

Scientific classification
- Kingdom: Plantae
- Clade: Tracheophytes
- Clade: Angiosperms
- Clade: Monocots
- Clade: Commelinids
- Order: Arecales
- Family: Arecaceae
- Genus: Salacca
- Species: S. ramosiana

Binomial name
- Salacca ramosiana Mogea

= Salacca ramosiana =

Species of palm

Salacca ramosiana is a species of palm in the genus Salacca. It is native to the Philippines and the island of Borneo. It bears palms with pinnate fronds and long sharp spines along the margins of the petioles.
