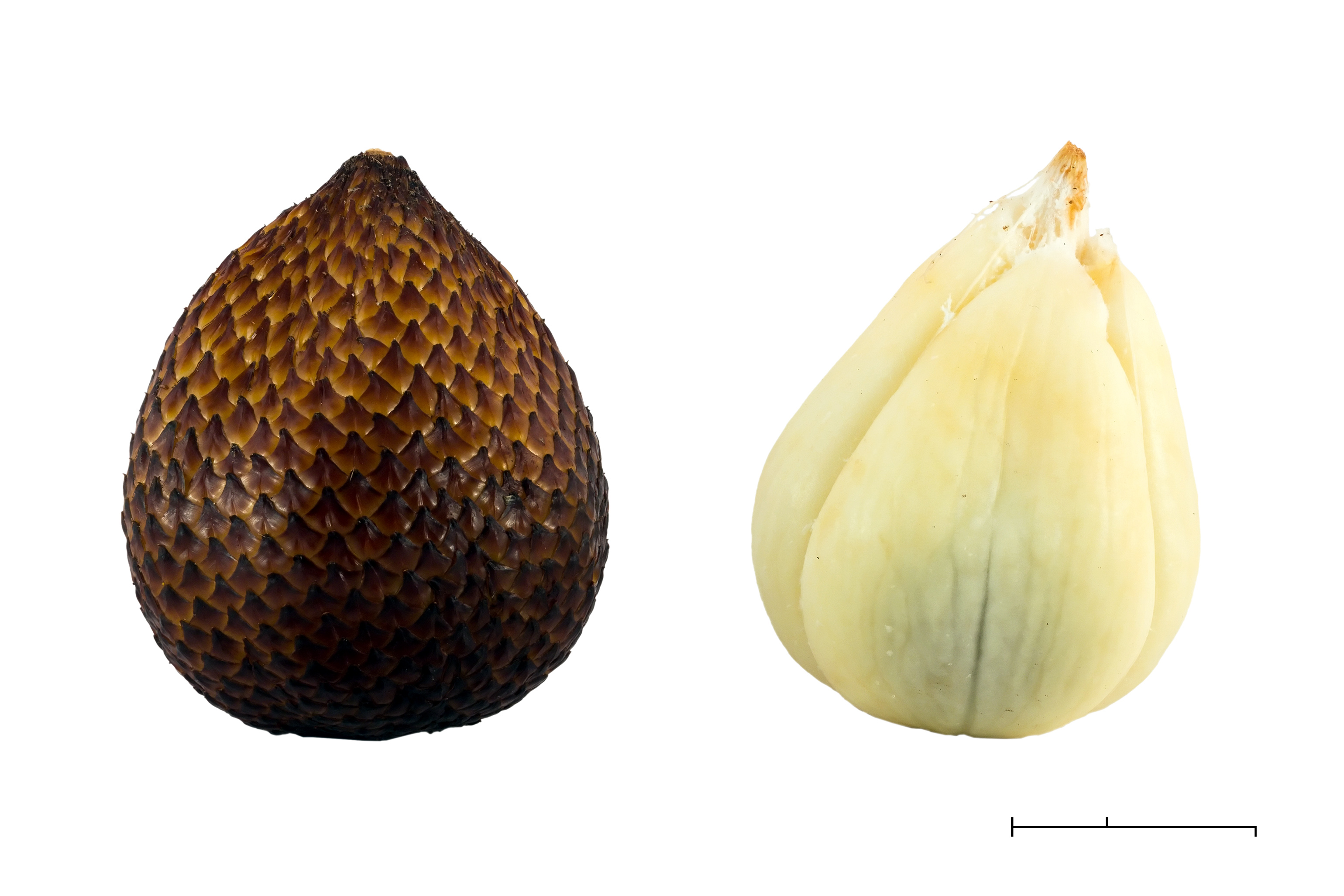
- Salacca zalacca fruit

Scientific classification
- Kingdom: Plantae
- Clade: Tracheophytes
- Clade: Angiosperms
- Clade: Monocots
- Clade: Commelinids
- Order: Arecales
- Family: Arecaceae
- Subfamily: Calamoideae
- Tribe: Calameae
- Genus: Salacca; Reinw.

Synonyms
- Salakka Reinw. ex Blume; Zalacca Rumph. ex Blume; Lophospatha Burret

= Salacca =

Genus of palms

Salacca is a genus of about 20 species of palms native to Southeast Asia and the eastern Himalayas. They are dioecious (with the exception of Salak Bali) and pollinated by Curculionidae beetles.

They are very short-stemmed palms, with leaves up to 6–8 m long. The leaves have a spiny petiole; in most species they are pinnate with numerous leaflets, but some species, notably S. magnifica, have undivided leaves. The fruit grow in clusters at the base of the plants, and are edible in many species, with a reddish-brown scaly skin covering a white pulp and one to two large inedible seeds. The Salak (S. zalacca) or snake fruit is the species most widely grown for its fruit; the firm white pulp has a slight acidic taste. The skin of the snakefruit has a unique texture not unlike that of a snake's skin, rough to the touch in one direction but smooth in the other.

== Species ==
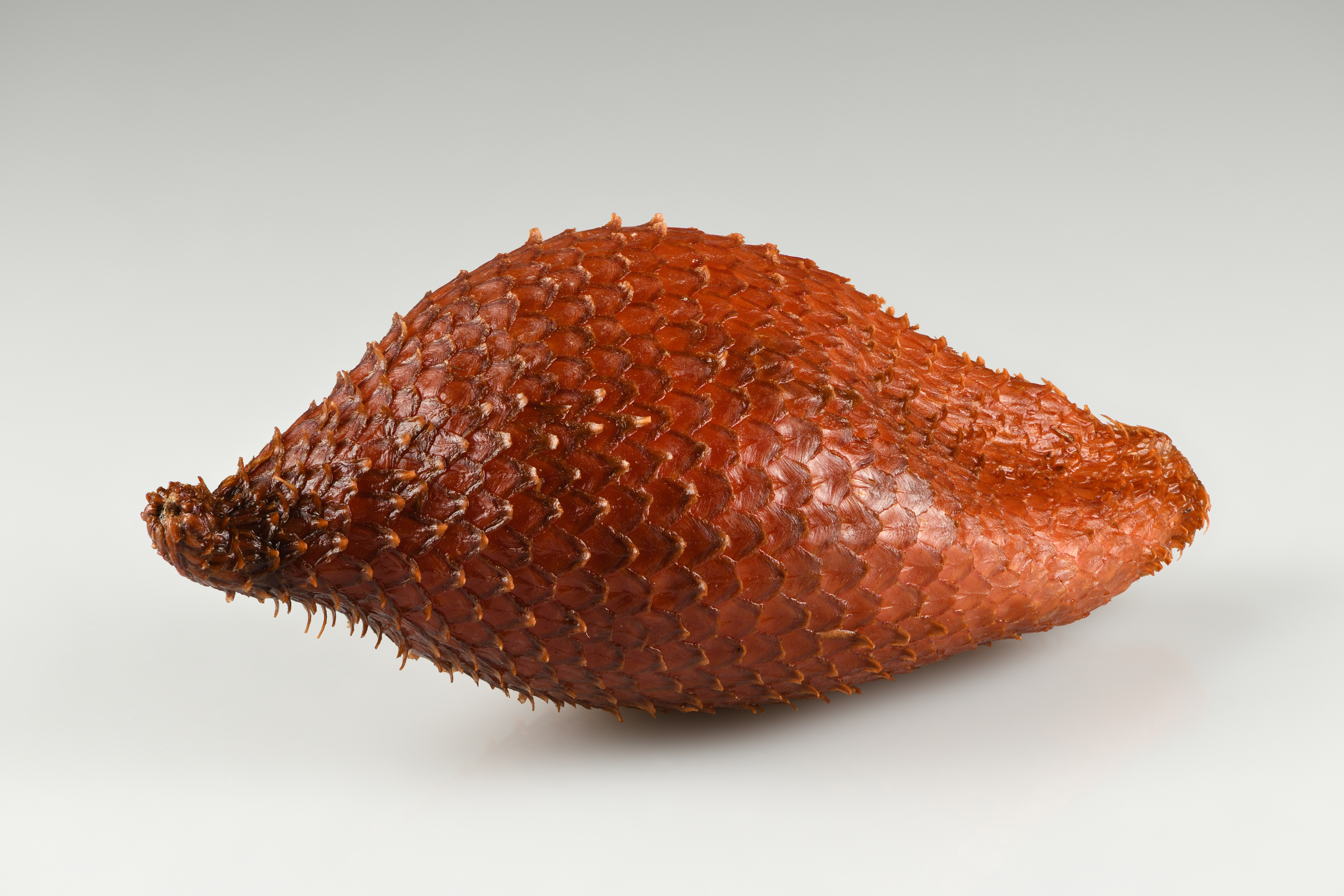
The fruit of the Salacca wallichiana are called Luk rakam (ลูกระกำ) in Thailand

- Salacca acehensis Zumaidar. - Aceh
- Salacca affinis Griff. - Borneo, Sumatra, Malaysia
- Salacca bakeriana J.Dransf. - Sarawak
- Salacca clemensiana Becc. - Borneo, Philippines
- Salacca dolicholepis Burret - Sabah
- Salacca dransfieldiana Mogea - Kalimantan
- Salacca flabellata Furtado - Malaysia
- Salacca glabrescens Griff. - Malaysia, Thailand
- Salacca graciliflora Mogea - Malaysia
- Salacca griffithii A.J.Hend. - Yunnan, Myanmar, Thailand
- Salacca lophospatha J.Dransf. & Mogea - Sabah - apparently extinct
- Salacca magnifica Mogea - Sabah
- Salacca minuta Mogea - Malaysia
- Salacca multiflora Mogea - Malaysia
- Salacca ramosiana Mogea - Sabah, Philippines
- Salacca rupicola J.Dransf. - Sarawak
- Salacca sarawakensis Mogea - Sarawak
- Salacca secunda Griff. - Assam, Bhutan, Arunachal Pradesh, Myanmar
- Salacca stolonifera Hodel - Thailand
- Salacca sumatrana Becc. - Sumatra
- Salacca vermicularis Becc. - Borneo
- Salacca wallichiana Mart. - Malaysia, Thailand, Myanmar, Sumatra
- Salacca zalacca (Gaertn.) Voss - Java, Sumatra; naturalized in Bali, Lombok, Timor, Malaysia, Maluku, Philippines, Sulawesi
