= Desa Group of Companies =

Malaysian dairy product company

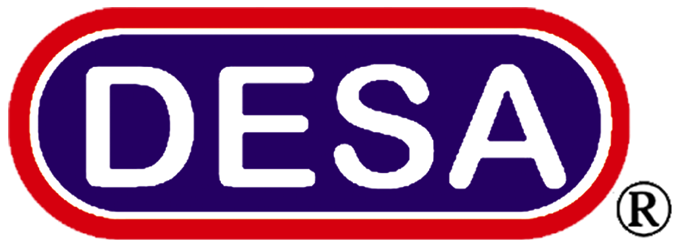
- Company type: State-owned enterprise
- Industry: Dairy product, ice cream, livestock, and poultry
- Founded: 1980; 46 years ago in Kota Kinabalu, Sabah, Malaysia
- Headquarters: Level 3, West Wing, Wisma 2020, 18 Lorong Belia, Karamunsing, 88100, Kota Kinabalu, Malaysia
- Owners: Desa (Sabah) Sdn Bhd; Desa Cattle Sdn Bhd; Desa Plus Sdn Bhd
- Website: desaplus.com

Desa Group of Companies (doing business as Desa Group) is the main dairy product, livestock, and poultry company in the state of Sabah, Malaysia since 1980. Owned by Desa (Sabah) Sdn Bhd, it is the main dairy product producer in Borneo. The company feature a 199-hectare dairy farm at Mesilau in Kundasang, with an estimate 150,000 litres fresh milk produced each month, as well a cattle feedlot for meat production in Lok Kawi and Penampang. Young cattle from the farm are fed with specially formulated feed to average 420 kilograms (930 lb) weight before being slaughtered at Meat Technology Centre.

== History ==
Dairy and cattle-farming began in Sabah in the 1980s with the company developed by Harris Salleh under state government-linked company to see the state to develop its own self-produced dairy products and meat. The state government also establish a cattle farm in Darwin, Australia and the state finally reached its target in 1998 to become 100% self-sufficiency in the production of meats. The farm was owned by Desa Cattle Sdn Bhd, a subsidiary of Village Development Corporation (KPD). After several years operating, Harris together with Lajim Ukin decided to sell the farm in Australia; along with the remaining thousands of acres of farm in Sabah although Lajim denied his involvement in the selling. The company was then privatised in 1994. Its headquarters in Kota Kinabalu was established in 2010, (Note: See Bloomberg link on external links section.) although based on a news release in 2011, the company has been under the state government.
