= Kundasang Valley =

Valley in Sabah, Malaysia

Coordinates: 5°59′32.6″N 116°35′08.8″E

Kundasang Valley (Malay: Lembah Kundasang) is a valley where the Kundasang town is located in Sabah, Malaysia, primarily in the highlands of Sabah southeast side of Mount Kinabalu.

== Environment ==
The valley were known to be located at the intersection of regional fault zones of Quaternary age, where widespread ground movements pose the main hazard based on a mapped geology since 1958. As a result of extensive exploration of land for agricultural purposes, the rapid opening of new agriculture land in the valley also has caused the temperature in the area to increase significantly.

== Features ==
The valley is featured with terraced hill slopes planted with highlands vegetables as well a dairy farm dubbed as Sabah's "Little New Zealand" where the cow breed of Holstein Friesian milk and dairy product were produced.

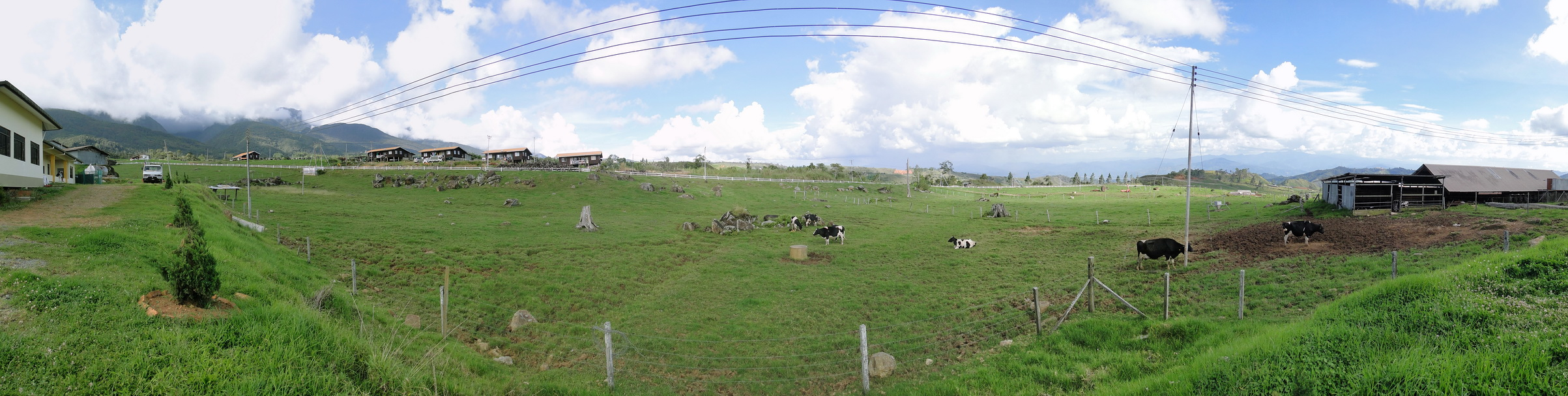
Desa Dairy Farm in the valley.

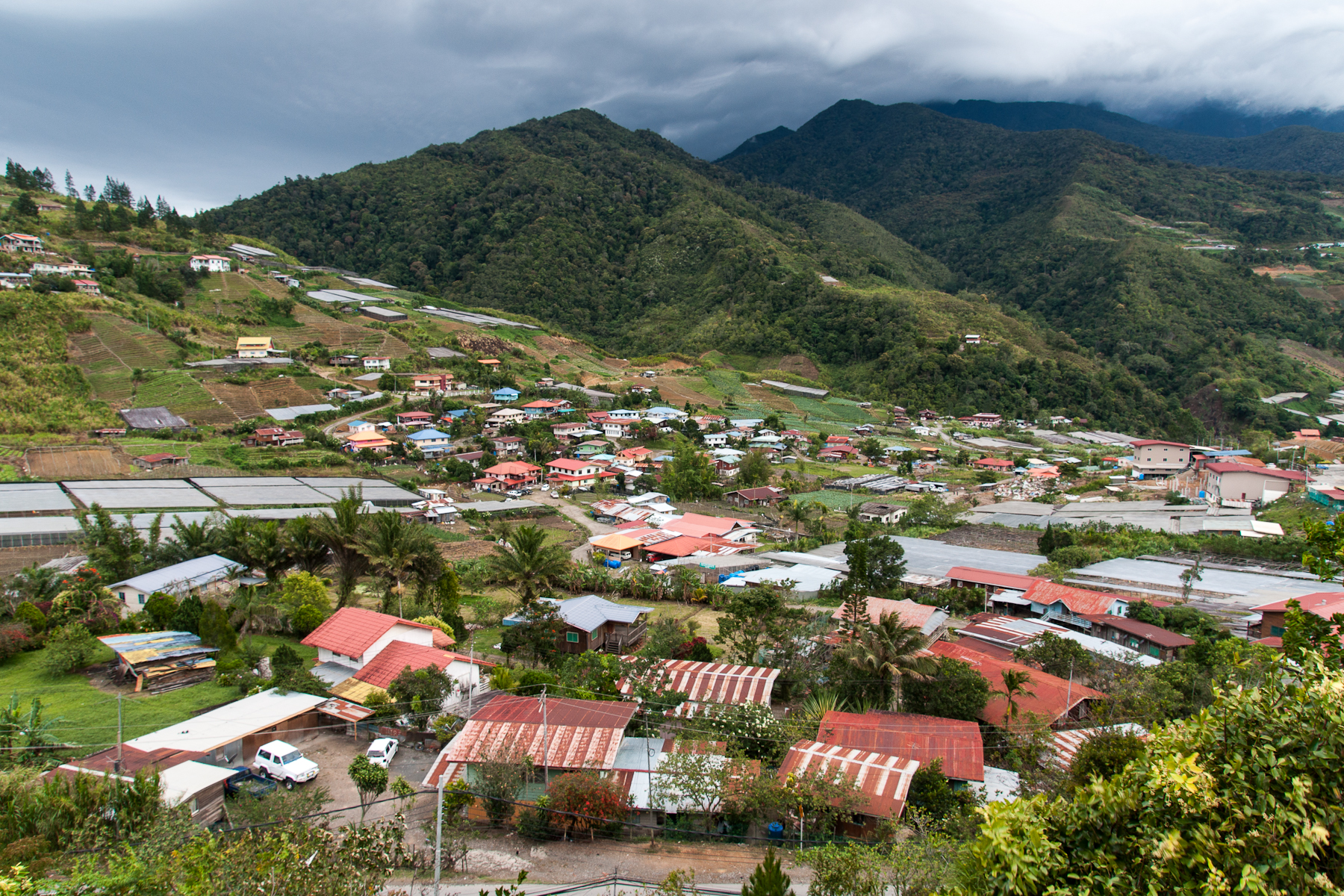
Panoramic view of Kundasang Valley.

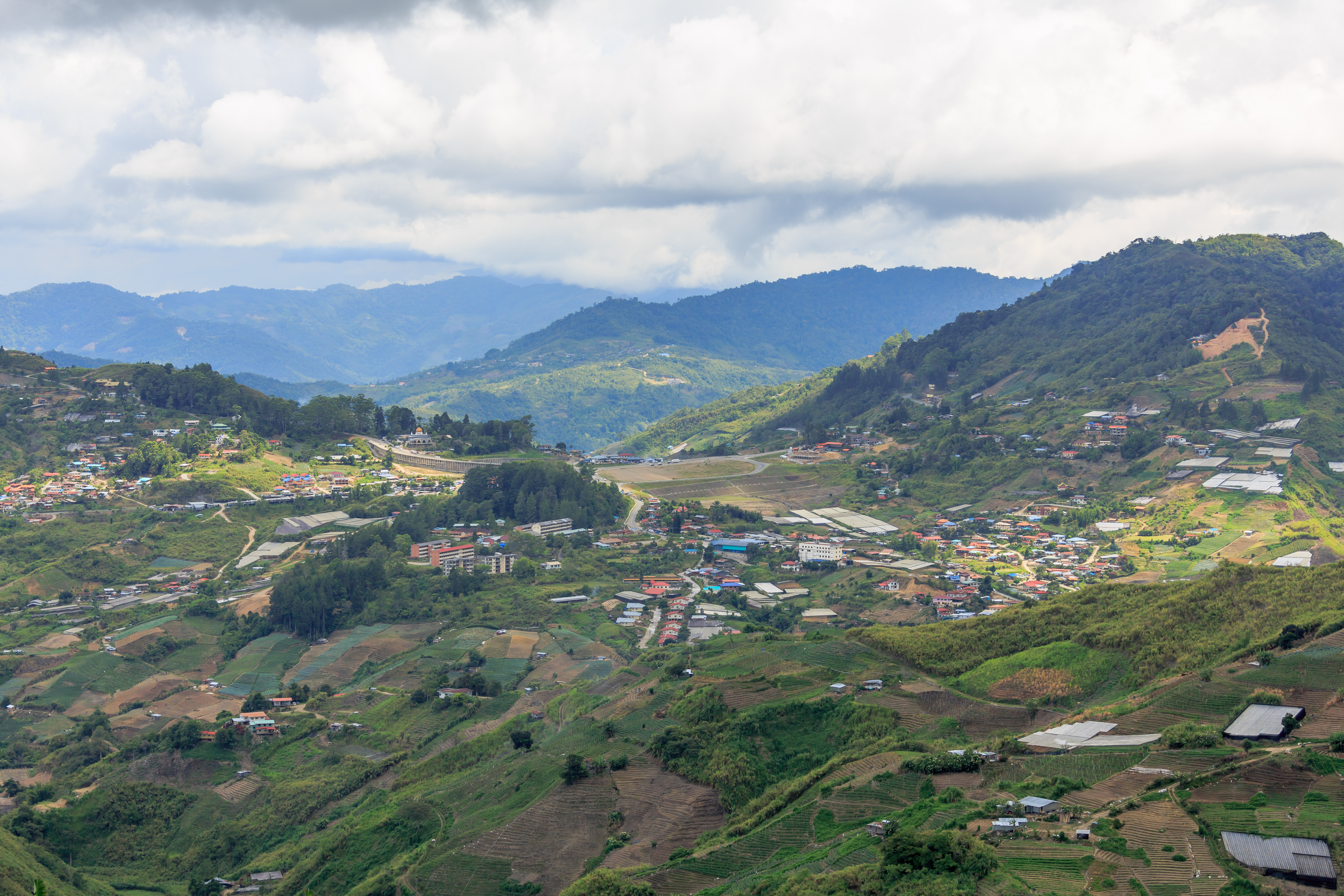
Panoramic view from Dream World Resort on Kundasang town inside the valley.

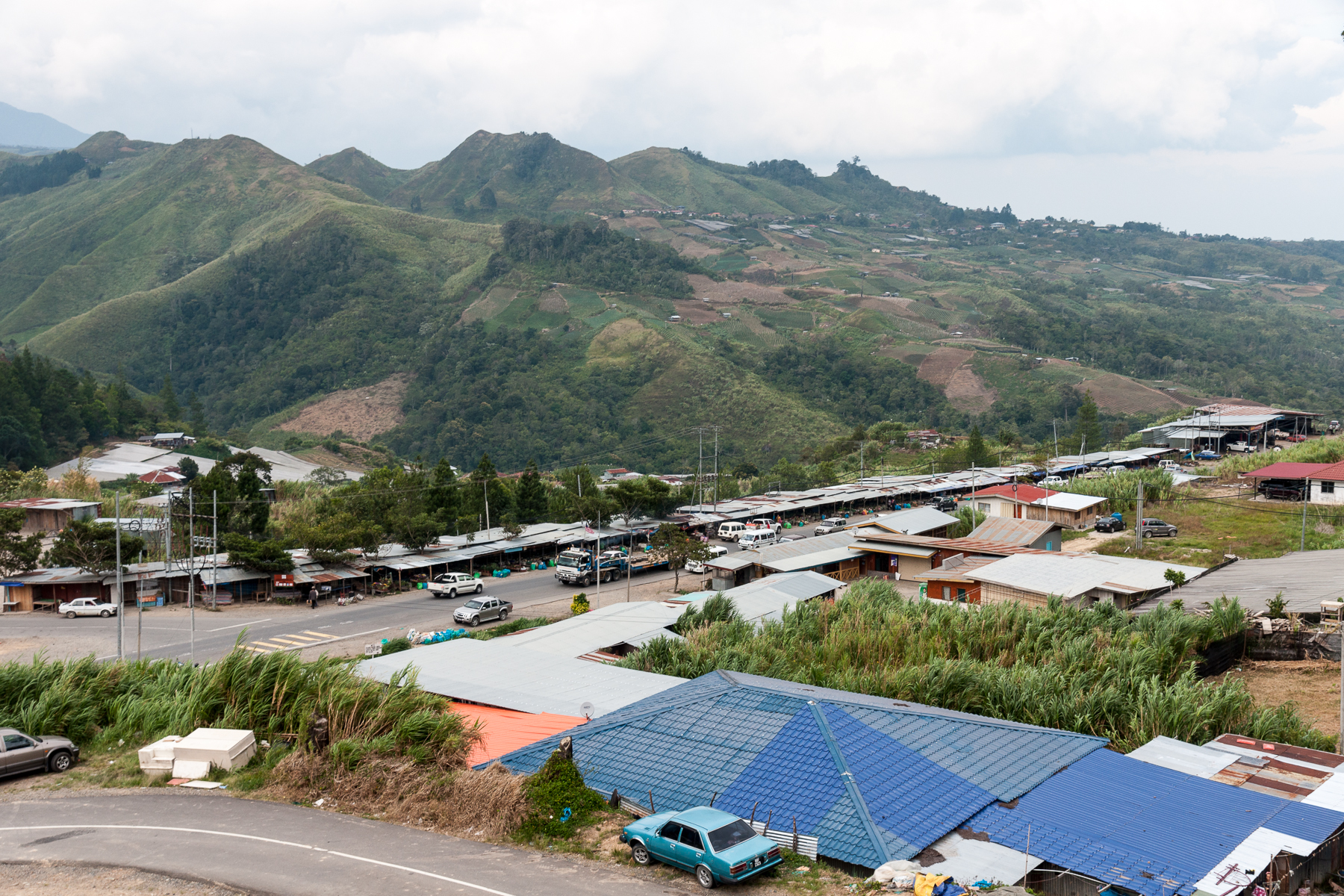
Vegetable market in the valley.
