= Farm Fresh (company) =

Malaysian dairy products company

Farm Fresh Berhad
- Formerly: The Holstein Milk Company Sdn. Bhd.
- Company type: Public
- Industry: Dairy
- Founded: 18 May 2009; 17 years ago
- Headquarters: Sedili, Johor, Malaysia
- Area served: Worldwide
- Key people: Loi Tuan Ee (COO); Azmi Zainal (COD)
- Products: Dairy products including milk, yoghurt and whipping cream
- Revenue: ▲RM810.9 million (2024); RM 629.7 million (2023)
- Net income: ▲RM 63.3 million (2024); RM 49.9 million (2023)
- Total equity: ▲RM 693 million (2024); RM 635.9 million (2023)
- Owner: Agrifood Resources Sdn. Bhd.
- Parent: Khazanah Nasional
- Website: www.farmfresh.com.my

Farm Fresh Berhad is a Malaysian dairy products company based in Sedili, Johor. Founded in 2009 by Loi Tuan Eee, it has two factories operated in Bandar Muadzam Shah, Pahang and in Larkin, Johor where the factory's production capacity reaches 12 million liters per year with an estimated one million liters per month. Malaysian sovereign wealth fund, Khazanah Nasional through its wholly-owned subsidiary, Agrifood Resources was its substantial shareholder of Farm Fresh, but divested its shares in September 2025.

== History ==
Loi Tuan Eee, a Perak native, founded Farm Fresh in 2009. The company is based in Sedili, Johor. Before that, he spent 20 years at the packaging company before resigned his job in 2005. A year later, he founded Rainforest Capital in Kota Tinggi, which specialized in goat, dragon fruit and arowana businesses. Philippine president Bongbong Marcos on Friday (October 3, 2025) inaugurated the Farm Fresh Milk Plant in Pampanga, a new milk processing facility that would help increase the local production and supply of dairy products in the country.

== See also ==
- Dutch Lady
- Greenfields
- Fonterra
- Desa Cattle
