= Salacca flabellata =

Scientific classification
- Kingdom: Plantae
- Clade: Tracheophytes
- Clade: Angiosperms
- Clade: Monocots
- Clade: Commelinids
- Order: Arecales
- Family: Arecaceae
- Genus: Salacca
- Species: S. flabellata

Binomial name
- Salacca flabellata Furtado

Species of plant

Salacca flabellata is a palm (family Arecaceae or Palmae) native to peninsular Malaysia. It is the only palm which sometimes has subterranean flowers although the inflorescence usually lays on the surface. When in contact with the soil, the tip of the inflorescence can produce a plantlet which will grow as large as the mother plant. The fruit of this and all Salaccas is covered with smooth, precisely arranged scales. The plant is trunkless and has "V" shaped leaves. It was described in 1949.
