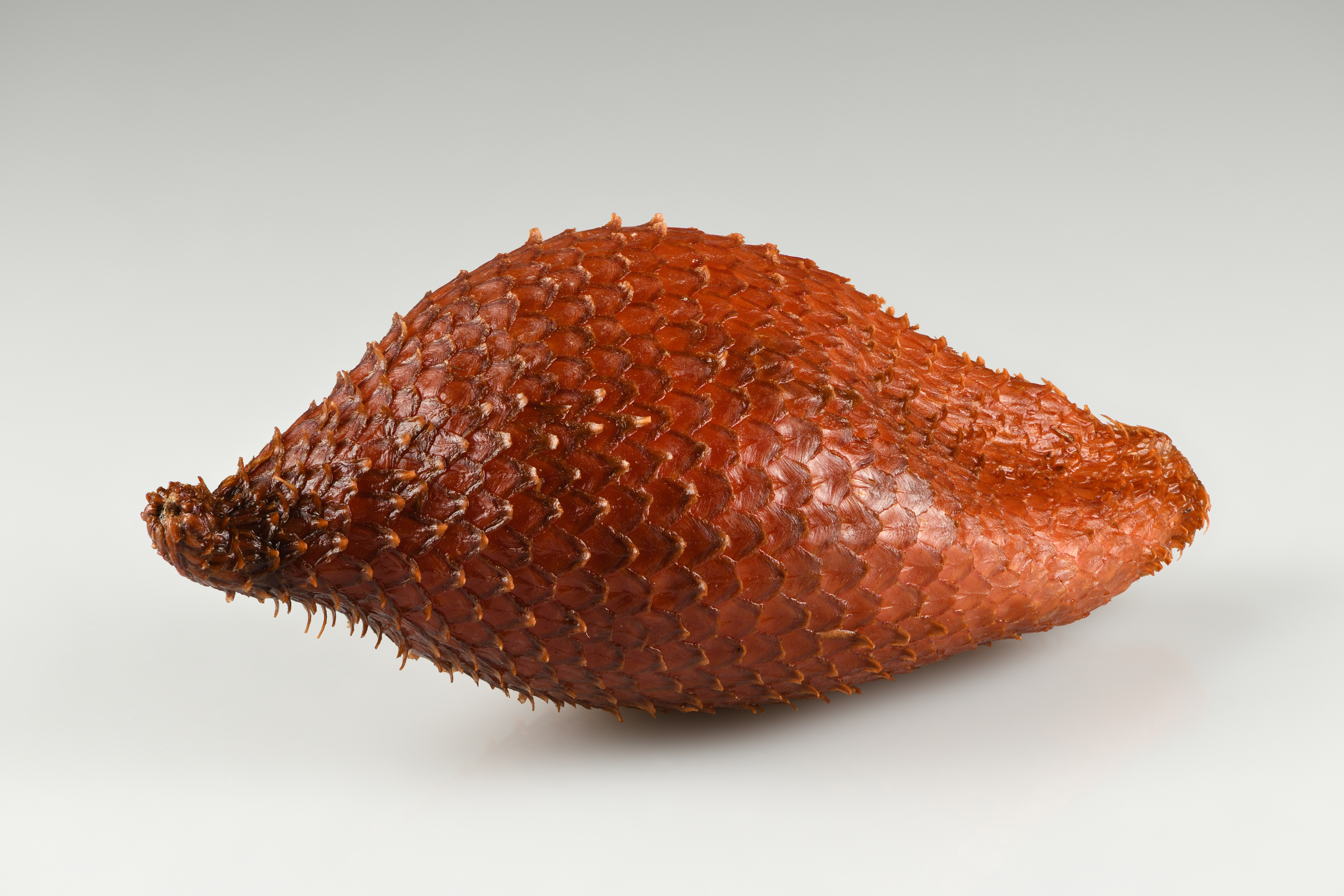

Scientific classification
- Kingdom: Plantae
- Clade: Tracheophytes
- Clade: Angiosperms
- Clade: Monocots
- Clade: Commelinids
- Order: Arecales
- Family: Arecaceae
- Genus: Salacca
- Species: S. wallichiana

Binomial name
- Salacca wallichiana Mart. 1838

= Salacca wallichiana =

Species of palm

Salacca wallichiana is a species of plant in the family Arecaceae. The specific epithet (wallichiana) honors Danish botanist Nathaniel Wallich. It is found in Malaysia, Thailand, Myanmar, and Sumatra. It is valued for its edible fruit which is consumed across its native range.
