= Desa Dairy Farm =

Dairy farm in Sabah, Malaysia

Coordinates: 6°0′59″N 116°35′28.9″E

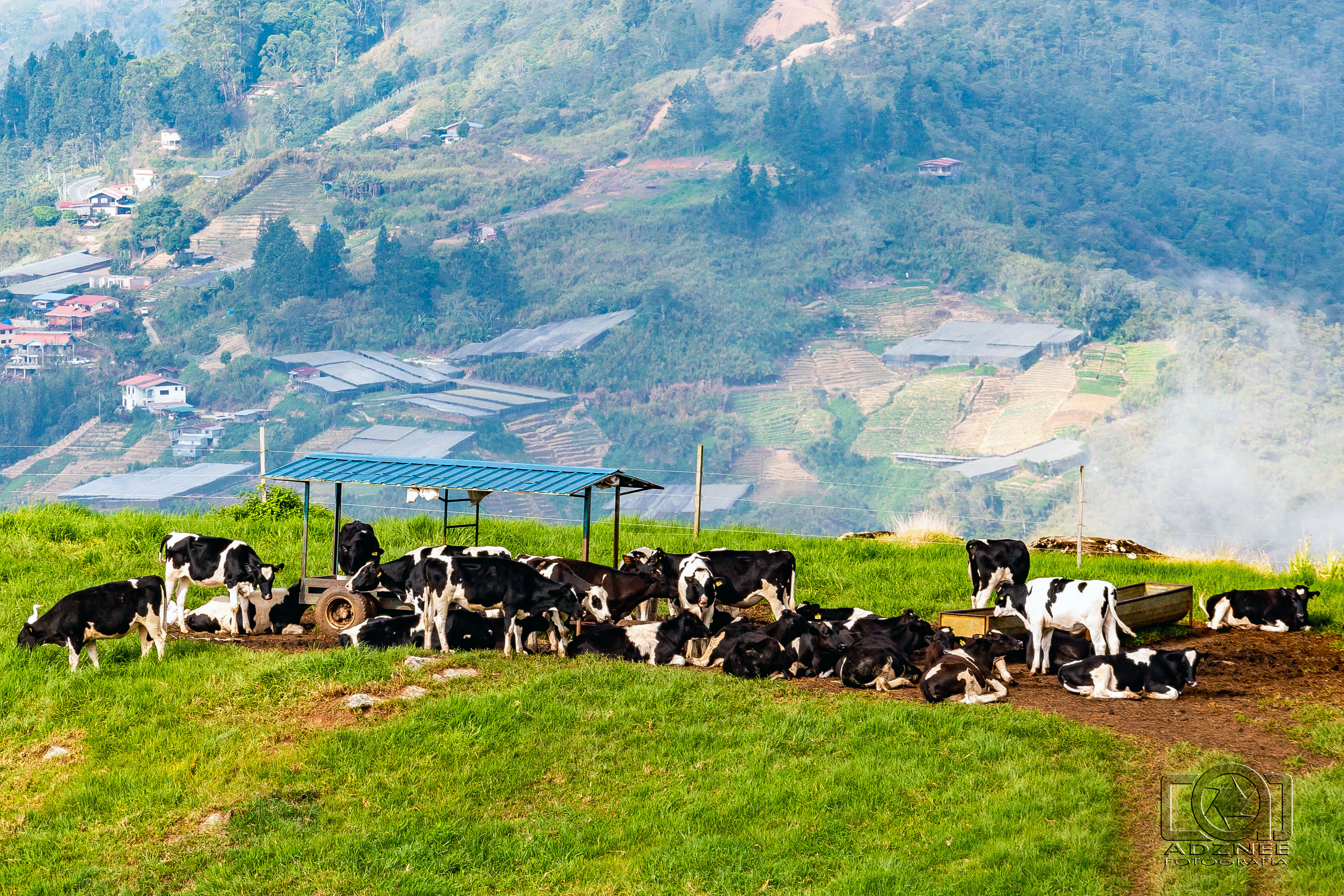
Cows at the dairy farm

Desa Dairy Farm is a dairy farm located at the foot of Mount Kinabalu in Kundasang Valley, Sabah, Malaysia owned by the Desa Group of Companies where most of Sabah's cow milk and dairy product been produced. The farm covering an area of 199-hectare and has been frequently dubbed as Sabah's "Little New Zealand" with geographic panorama scenery view almost looked like in the latter country; as well with its cow breed of Holstein Friesian which is imported from the country.

== History ==
The dairy farm in Kundasang has been established since the 1980s, first as the distributors of packaged boxes of milk to government schools and sold throughout Sabah.
