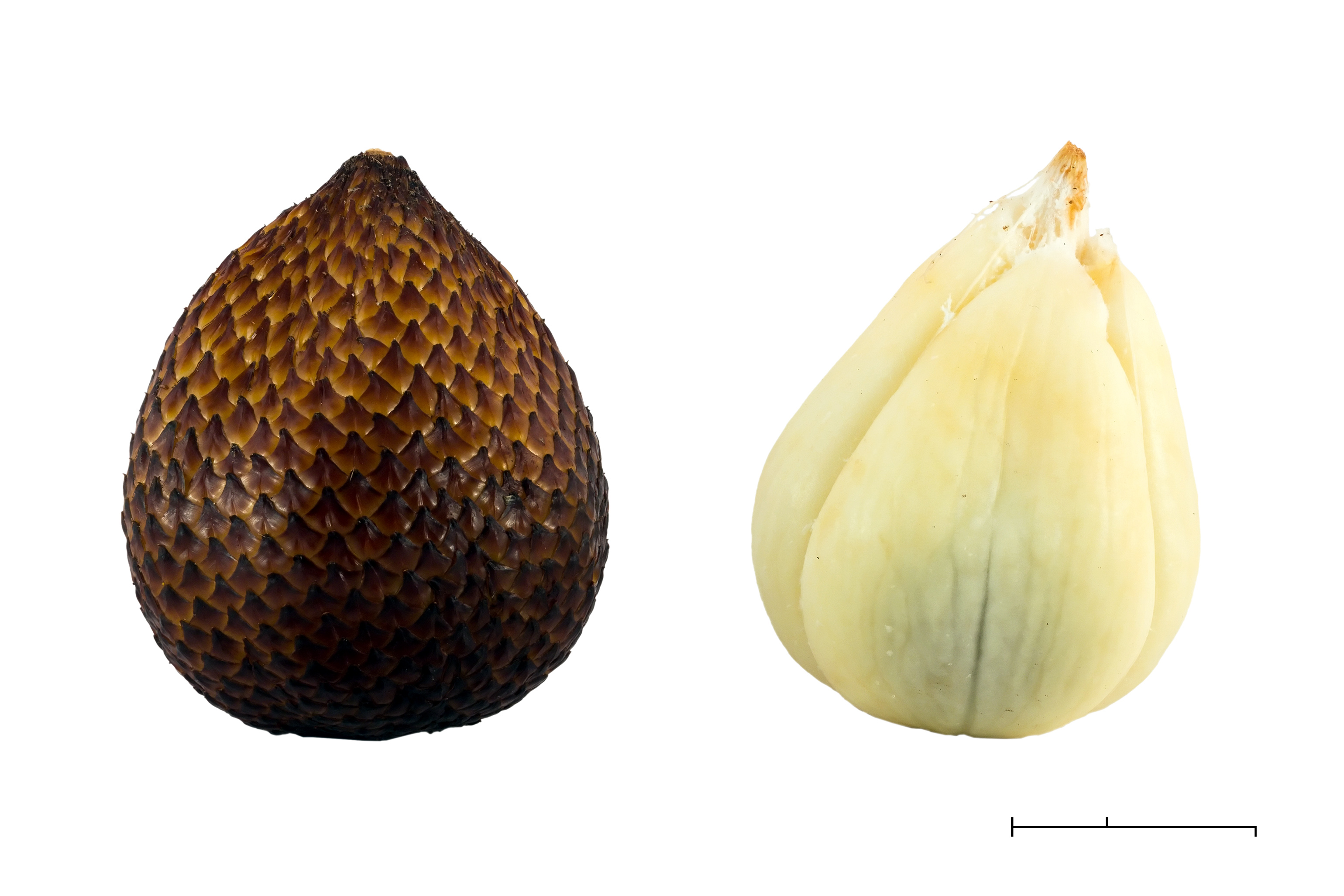
- Salak fruit (salak pondoh cultivar)

Scientific classification
- Kingdom: Plantae
- Clade: Tracheophytes
- Clade: Angiosperms
- Clade: Monocots
- Clade: Commelinids
- Order: Arecales
- Family: Arecaceae
- Genus: Salacca
- Species: S. zalacca

Binomial name
- Salacca zalacca (Gaertn.) Voss

Synonyms
- Calamus zalacca Gaertn.; Salacca edulis Reinw.; Salacca rumphii Wall.; Salacca blumeana Mart.; Calamus salakka Willd. ex Steud.; Salacca edulis var. amboinensis Becc.; Salacca zalacca var. amboinensis (Becc.) Mogea

= Salak =

Species of palm

Salak (Salacca zalacca) is a species of palm tree (family Arecaceae) native to Java and Sumatra in Indonesia. It is cultivated in other regions of Indonesia as a food crop or snack, and popularly grown in Bali, Lombok, Timor, Maluku, Sulawesi and Papua.

== Description ==
Salak is a very short-stemmed palm, with leaves up to 6 metres (20 ft) long; each leaf has a two-metre-long (6 1/2-foot) petiole with spines up to 15 centimetres (6 inches) long, and numerous leaflets.

=== Fruit ===
The fruit grows in clusters at the base of the palm, and are also known as snake fruit or snakeskin fruit due to the reddish-brown scaly skin, which is removed before eating. Resembling a ripe fig in size and shape, it has a crunchy and moist consistency. The edible pulp inside, often compared to large peeled garlic cloves in appearance, offers a unique flavor profile. It typically presents a sweet and acidic taste with a notable astringent edge, which can vary significantly among different cultivars. The most recognized cultivars include the salak pondoh from Yogyakarta, known for its sweet flavor and dry, crumbly texture, and the salak Bali, famed for its moist crunchiness.

== Cultivation ==
The salak tree has been cultivated throughout Indonesia, and there are at least 30 cultivars, most of which have an astringent taste and are sweet. Two popular cultivars are salak pondoh from Yogyakarta province (found in 1980s) and salak Bali from Bali.

=== Salak pondoh ===
Salak pondoh is an important fruit in the Yogyakarta province on the island of Java. In the five years to 1999, the annual production in Yogyakarta doubled to 28,666 tons. Its popularity (compared with other cultivars) among local Indonesian consumers is mainly due to the intensity of its aroma and its sweet flavor even before reaching full maturity.

Salak pondoh has three more superior variations, namely pondoh super, pondoh hitam (black pondoh), and pondoh gading (ivory/yellowish-skinned pondoh).

Salak
Nutritional value per 100 g (3.5 oz)
- Energy: 322 kJ (77 kcal)
- Protein: 0.4 g
Vitamins and minerals
| Vitamins | Quantity %DV^{†} |
| Vitamin A equiv. beta-Carotene | 0% 4 μg |
| Thiamine (B1) | 3% 0.04 mg |
| Vitamin C | 2% 2 mg |
| Minerals | Quantity %DV^{†} |
| Calcium | 2% 28 mg |
| Copper | 9% 0.08 mg |
| Iron | 23% 4.2 mg |
| Phosphorus | 1% 18 mg |
| Zinc | 2% 0.2 mg |
- Other constituents: Quantity
- Water: 78.0 g
- ^{†}Percentages estimated using US recommendations for adults. Source: Indonesian Ministry of Health ER101

=== Salak Bali ===
Salak Bali is believed to originate from Sibetan village, in the highlands of Bali. It is commonly sold throughout the island and is a popular fruit with both locals and tourists.

It is the only monoecious salacca and one of the few monoecious palms in the Calameae clade.

There are more than 15 varieties of Salak Bali, with tastes ranging from sweet as sugar (Salak Gula Pasir), sweet-sour like a grapefruit (Salak Getih) and sour like a pineapple (Salak Nanas). The fruit is roughly the size of a large fig, and has a crunchy and moist consistency. In some varieties the fruit has a slight astringent, starchy mouthfeel such as with Salak Gading; with other fruits such as Salak Gondok and Salak Gula Pasir, there is little to no astringency.

==== Salak gula pasir ====
The most expensive cultivar of the Bali salak is the gula pasir (literally "sand sugar" or "grain sugar", referring to its fine-grainedness), which is smaller than the normal salak and is the sweetest of all salak.

As this variety of salak is known for its sweetness, it is sometimes fermented into Salak wine which has an alcohol content of 13.5 percent, similar to traditional wine made from grapes.

== Gallery ==
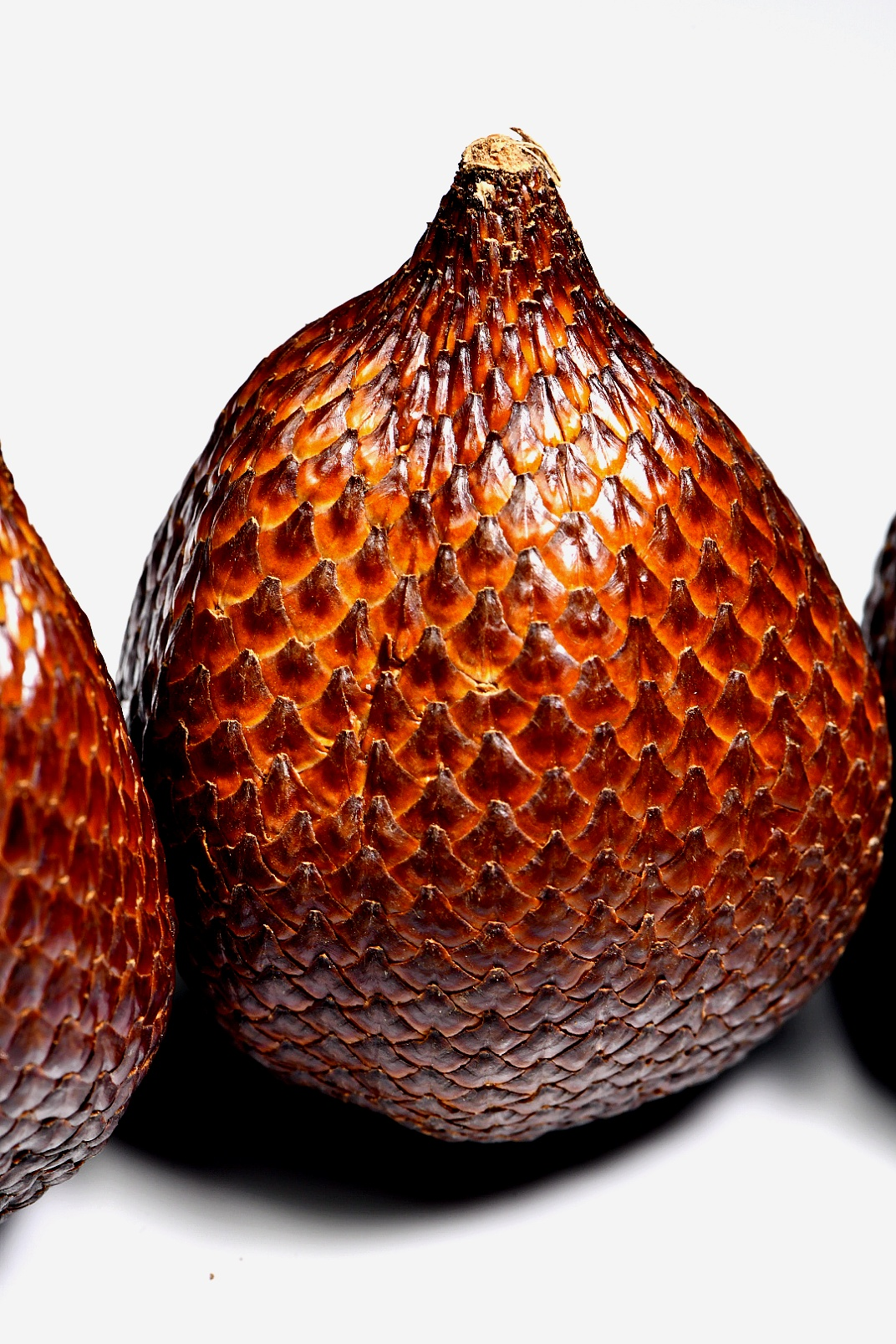
Close-up of salak showing its snake-like skin

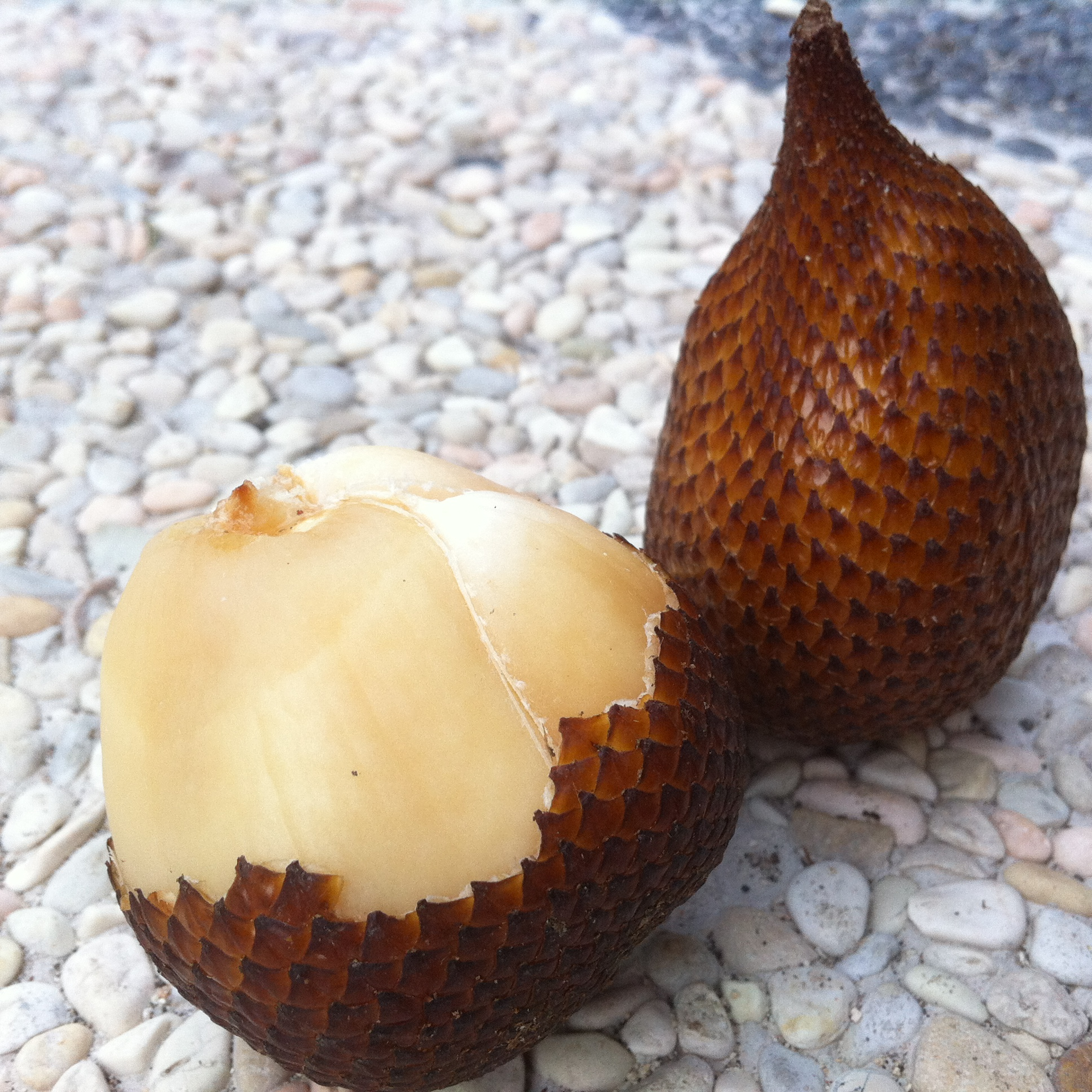
Peeled salak

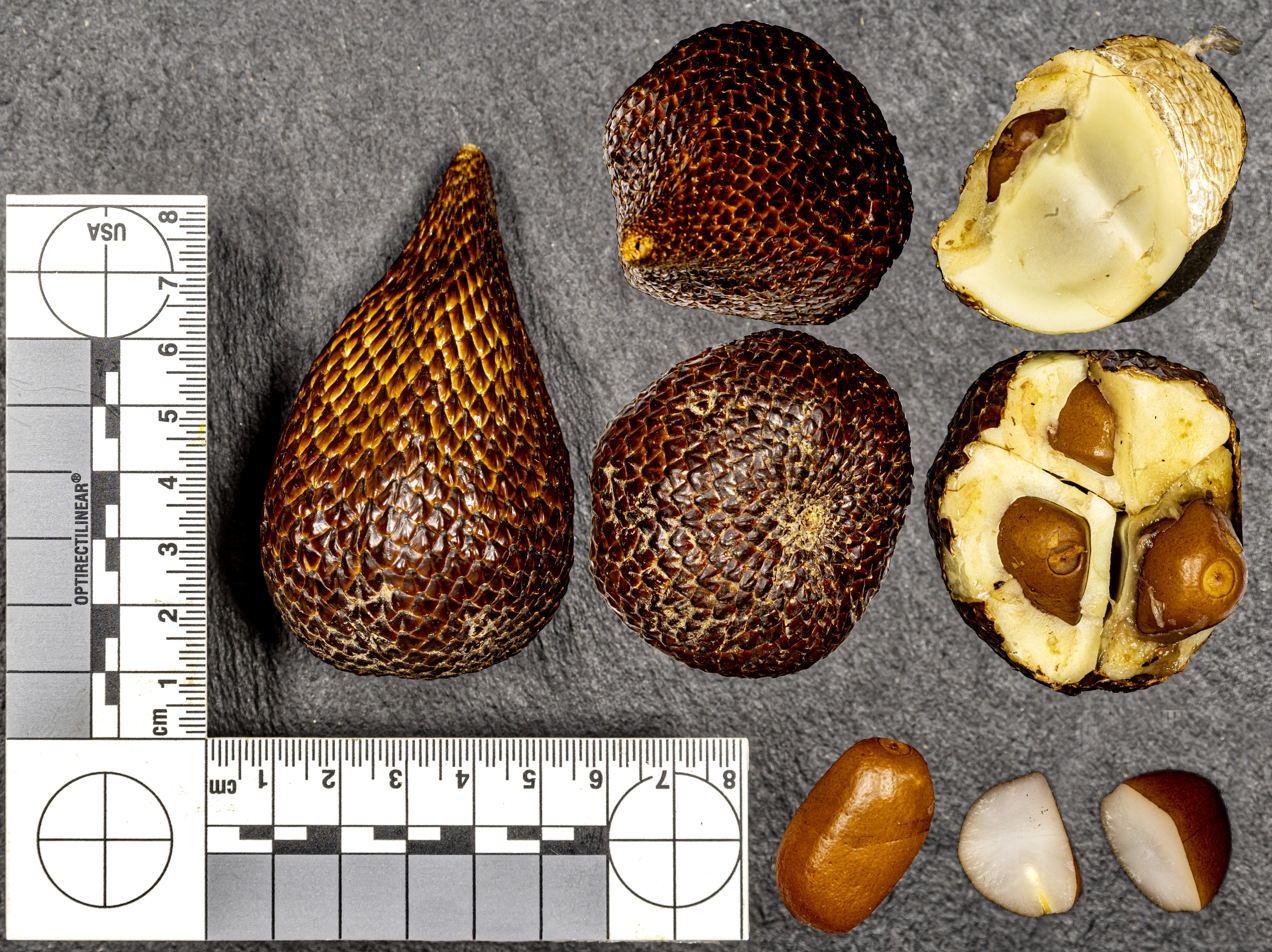
Salak and its seed

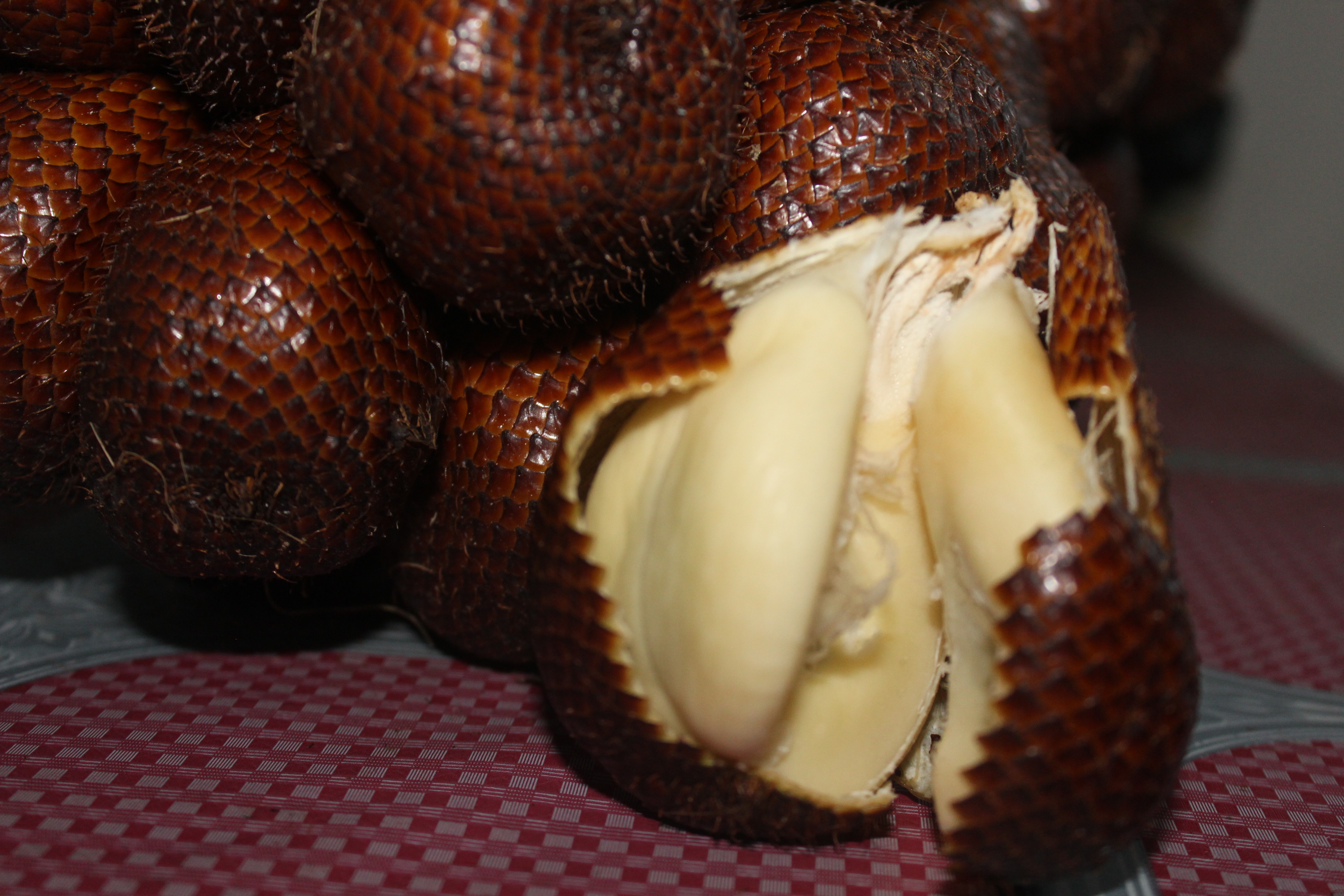
Salak pondoh super cultivated in Banjarnegara, Central Java

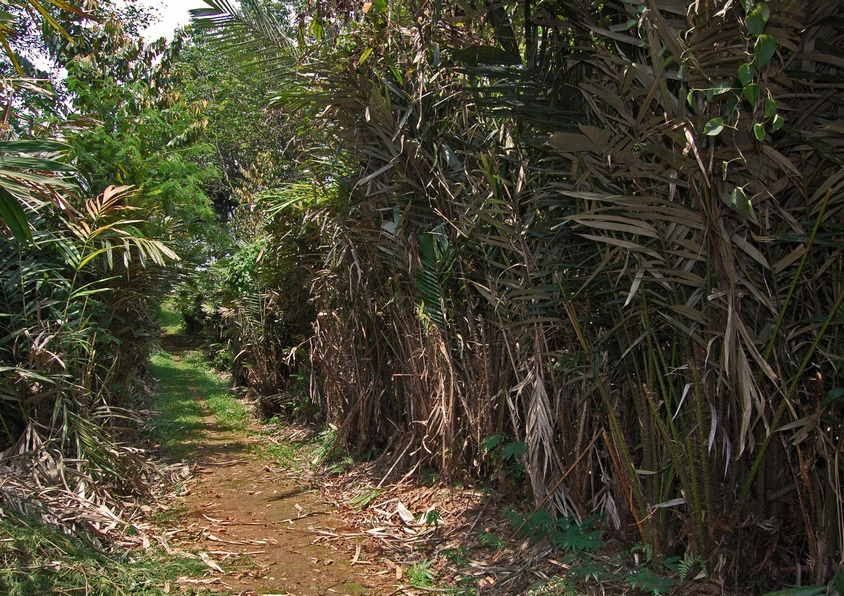
Salak agroforest, Bogor, West Java

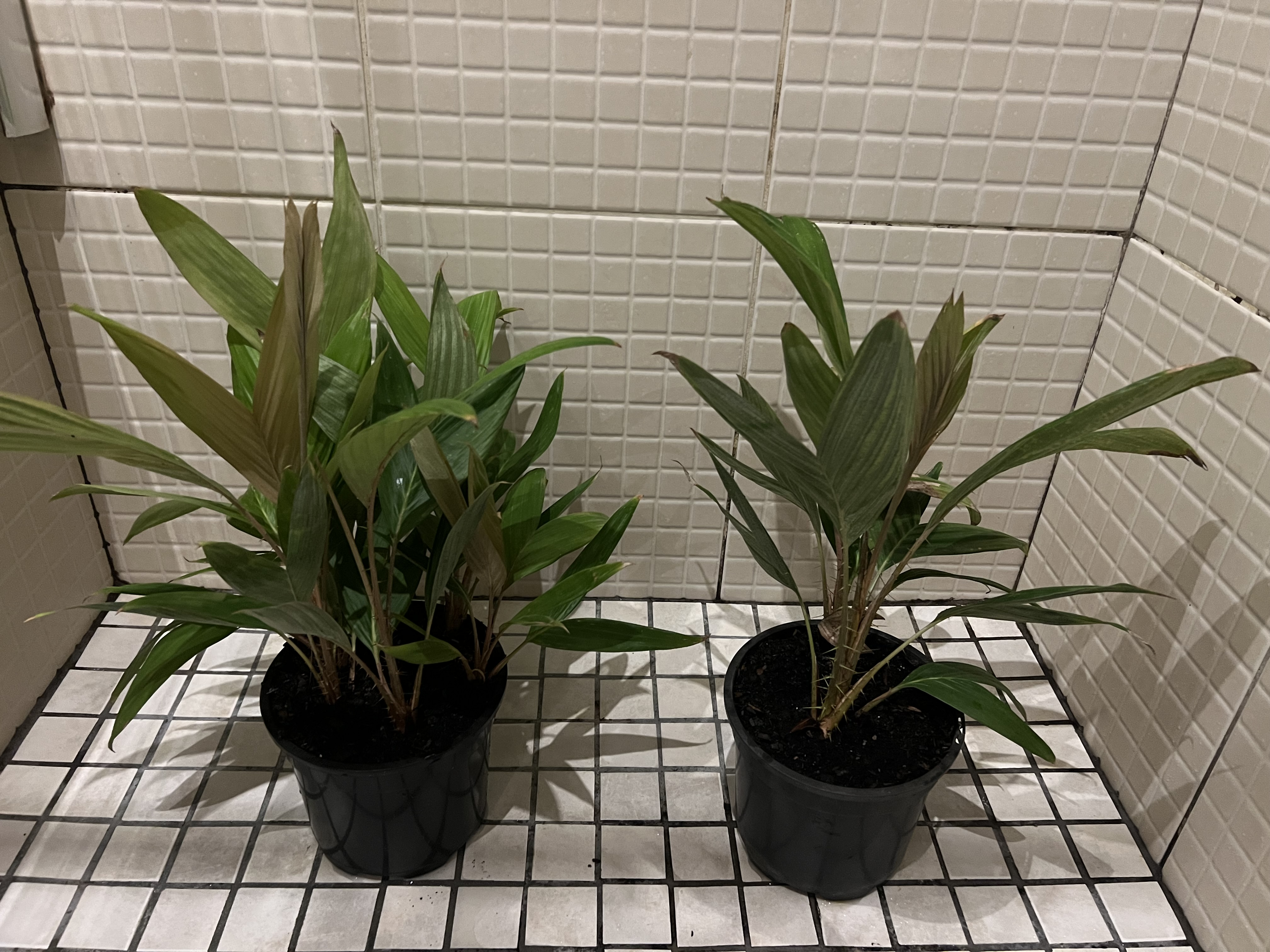
Salak Bali Gula Pasir (Bali Sweet), 1 year old

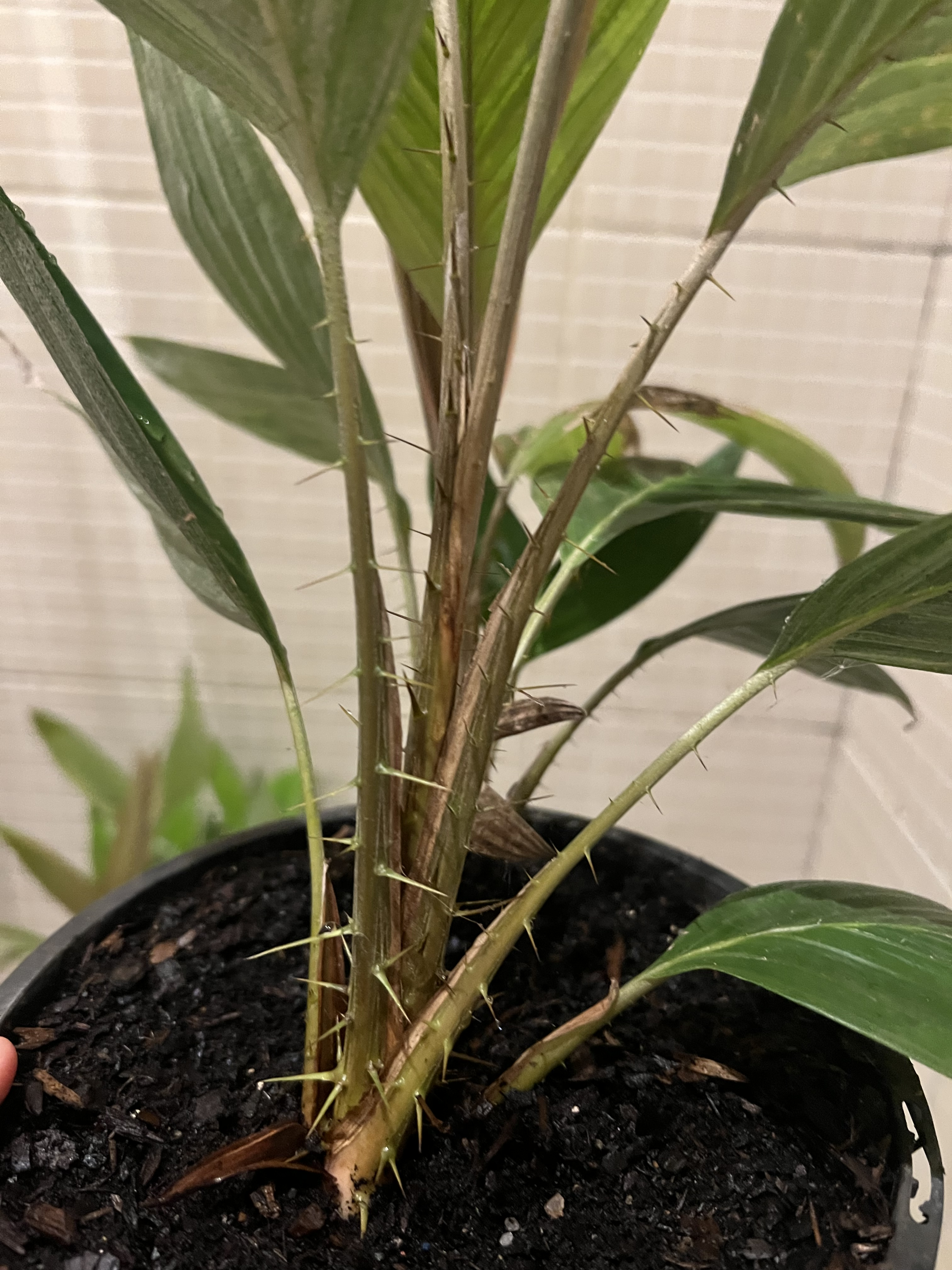
Salak Bali Gula Pasir (Bali Sweet), 1 year old
