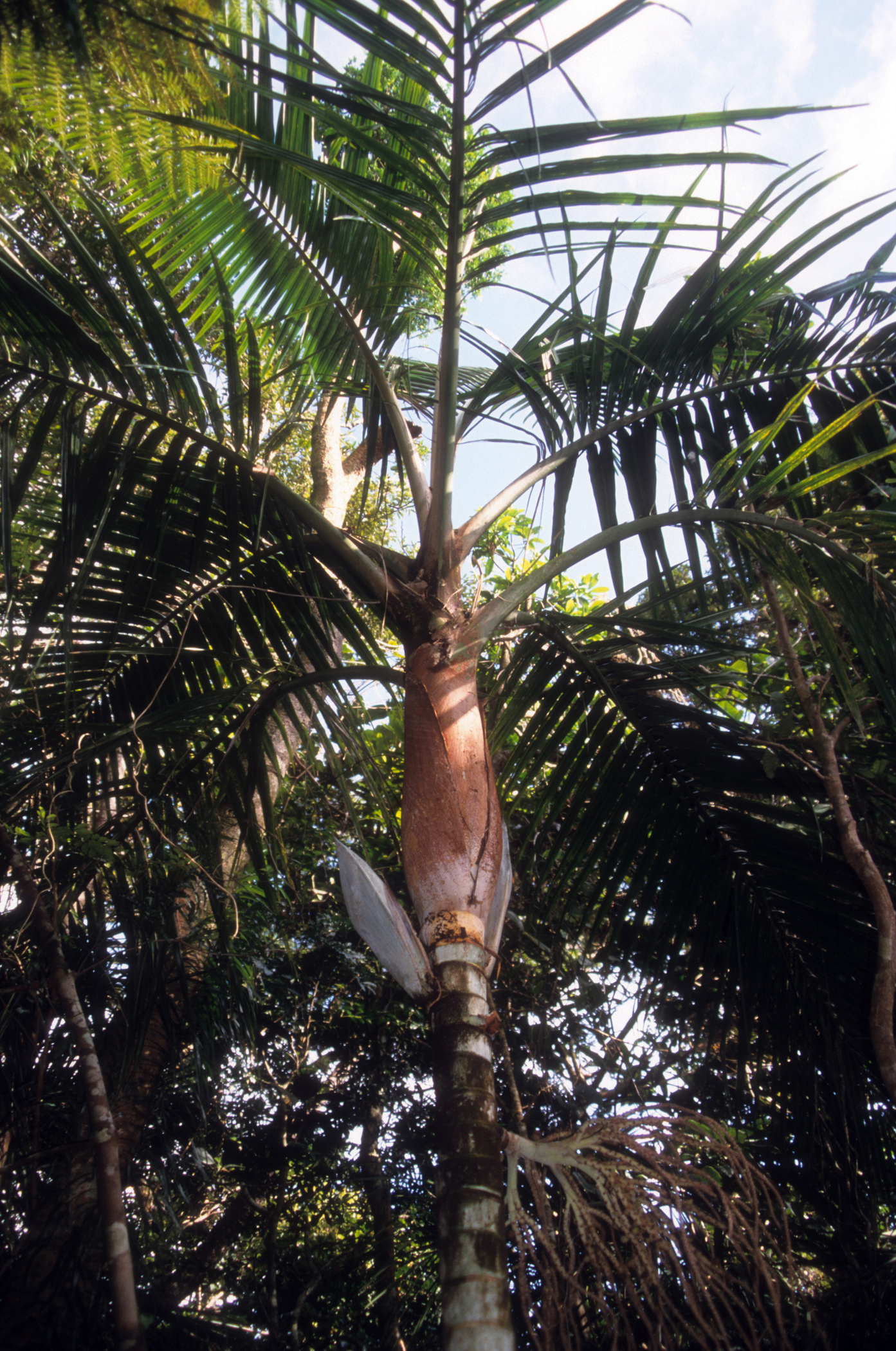
- Cyphophoenix alba

Scientific classification
- Kingdom: Plantae
- Clade: Tracheophytes
- Clade: Angiosperms
- Clade: Monocots
- Clade: Commelinids
- Order: Arecales
- Family: Arecaceae
- Subfamily: Arecoideae
- Tribe: Areceae
- Subtribe: Basseliniinae
- Genus: Cyphophoenix; H.Wendl. ex Hook.f.

Synonyms
- Campecarpus H.Wendl. ex Becc.; Veillonia H.E.Moore

= Cyphophoenix =

Genus of palms

Cyphophoenix is a genus of flowering plant in the family Arecaceae. It contains 4 known species, all endemic to New Caledonia. The relationships between Cyphophoenix and some other genera of the tribe Basseliniinae including Physokentia and the New Caledonia endemic Burretiokentia are not clear.

== List of species ==
- Cyphophoenix alba (H.E.Moore) Pintaud & W.J.Baker, Kew Bull. 63: 67 (2008).
- Cyphophoenix elegans (Brongn. & Gris) H.Wendl. ex Salomon, Palmen: 86 (1887).
- Cyphophoenix fulcita (Brongn.) Hook.f. ex Salomon, Palmen: 86 (1887).
- Cyphophoenix nucele H.E.Moore, Gentes Herb. 11: 165 (1976).
