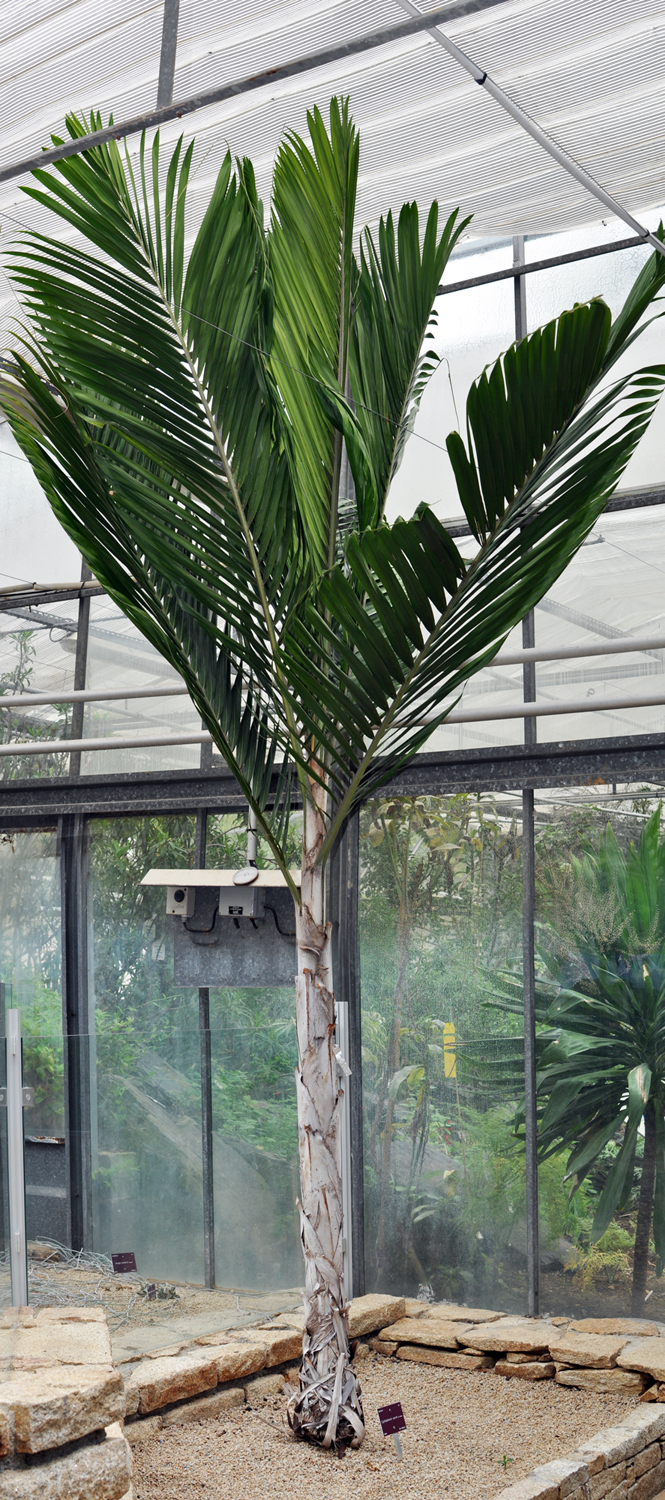

Conservation status
- Vulnerable (IUCN 3.1)

Scientific classification
- Kingdom: Plantae
- Clade: Tracheophytes
- Clade: Angiosperms
- Clade: Monocots
- Clade: Commelinids
- Order: Arecales
- Family: Arecaceae
- Genus: Cyphophoenix
- Species: C. nucele

Binomial name
- Cyphophoenix nucele H.E.Moore

= Cyphophoenix nucele =

Species of palm

Cyphophoenix nucele is a species of flowering plant in the family Arecaceae.

== Description ==
The height of the palm tree can get up to 12 meters. With a trunk diameter up to 20 centimeters. The leaves are slightly widened towards the base, and the crown holds up to eight spreading leaves. The leaves are around 50-60 centimeters long. The petiole are almost non existent. The inflorescence is around 50-90 centimeters long. The ellipsoid fruit is orange-red when ripe and has a smooth endocarp.

=== Distribution and habitat ===
It is endemic to New Caledonia. Its growth range is restricted to mesic forests on raised, coral limestone rocks at one locality, at and elevation of 50 meters.
