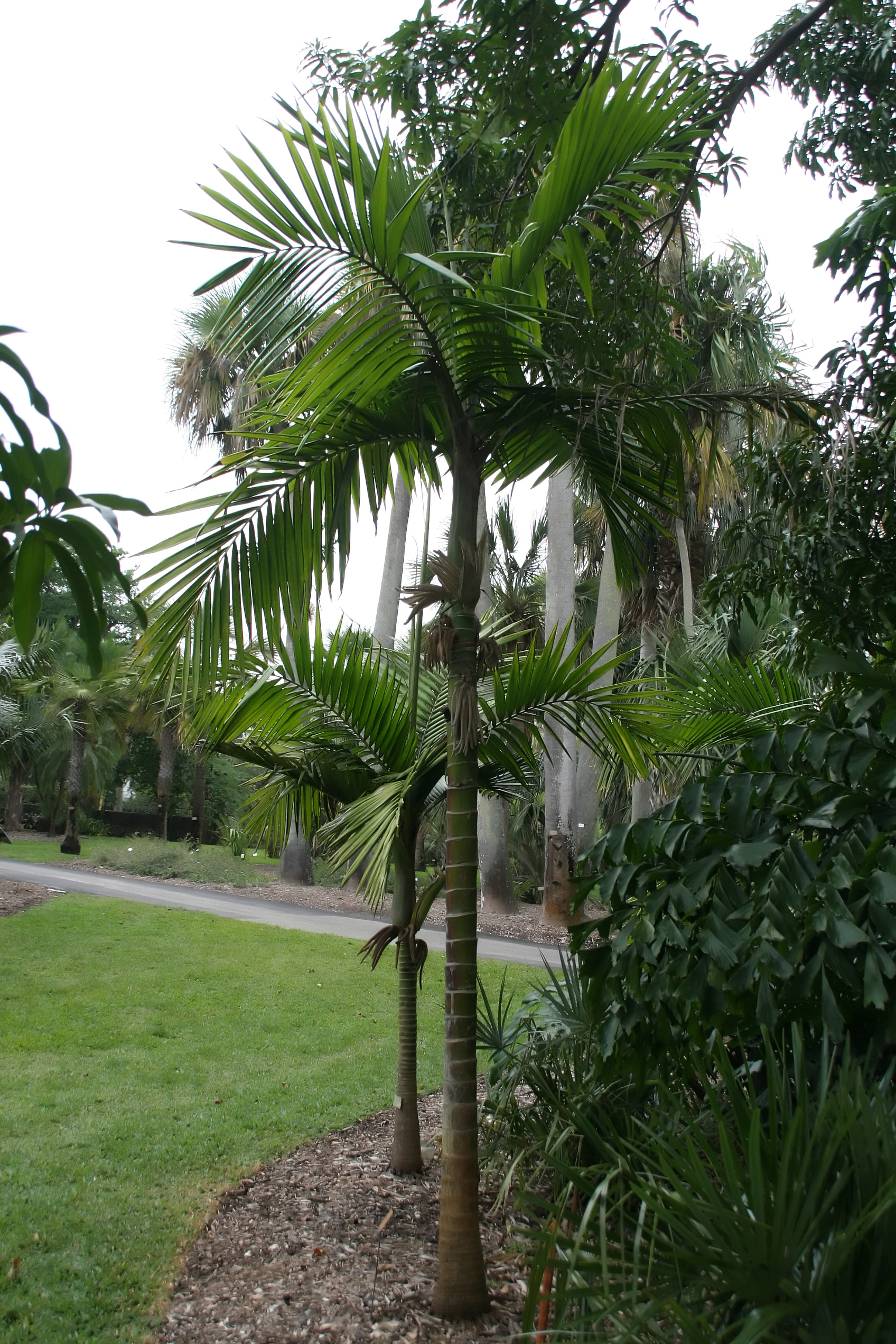
- Burretiokentia hapala

Scientific classification
- Kingdom: Plantae
- Clade: Tracheophytes
- Clade: Angiosperms
- Clade: Monocots
- Clade: Commelinids
- Order: Arecales
- Family: Arecaceae
- Tribe: Areceae
- Subtribe: Basseliniinae

= Basseliniinae =

Subtribe of palms

Basseliniinae is a subtribe of plants in the family Arecaceae.

Genera:

- Basselinia
- Burretiokentia
- Cyphophoenix
- Cyphosperma
- Lepidorrhachis
- Physokentia
