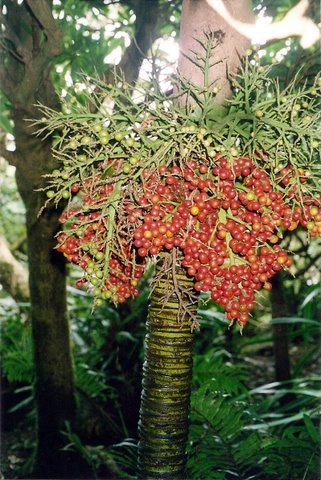
- Little Mountain Palm at 820 metres above sea level in the cloud forest at Mount Gower, Lord Howe Island

Scientific classification
- Kingdom: Plantae
- Clade: Tracheophytes
- Clade: Angiosperms
- Clade: Monocots
- Clade: Commelinids
- Order: Arecales
- Family: Arecaceae
- Subfamily: Arecoideae
- Tribe: Areceae
- Subtribe: Basseliniinae
- Genus: Lepidorrhachis (H. Wendl. & Drude) O.F. Cook
- Species: L. mooreana

Binomial name
- Lepidorrhachis mooreana (F.Muell.) O.F.Cook
- Lepidorrhachis is endemic to Lord Howe Island

= Lepidorrhachis =

Genus of flowering plants

Lepidorrhachis is a monotypic genus of flowering plant in the palm family restricted to Lord Howe Island. The genus name for the single, monoecious species, Lepidorrhachis mooreana, comes from two Greek word meaning "scale" and "rachis", and the epithet honors Charles Moore, first director of the Sydney Botanical Gardens. The common name is Little Mountain Palm.

== Description ==
These small palms are solitary-trunked, reaching heights of 3.5 m at a 15 cm diameter; prominently ringed by leaf scars, the trunks are green at the base and usually grey nearing the crown. The 1.5 m leaf is pinnate, arching and ascending, with 60 cm lanceolate leaflets from medium to dark green, which may hang slightly pendent in maturity. The leaves, petioles, and rachises are lightly or densely covered in scales. The inflorescence is short, thick, and much branched, and emerges at a node below the rudimentary crownshaft; it bears both pistillate and staminate flowers with three sepals and three petals. The fruit, known to attract rats, is spherical or nearly so, colored red at maturity, with one seed.

== Distribution and habitat ==
On Lord Howe Island, they grow at high elevations, from 800 m and up, in the cloud forests of the Gower and Lidgbird mountains. Constantly cloaked in a cool, windy, extremely moist climate, they grow in any soil type but will not withstand frost.
