= Physokentia thurstonii =

Conservation status
- Near Threatened (IUCN 3.1)

Scientific classification
- Kingdom: Plantae
- Clade: Tracheophytes
- Clade: Angiosperms
- Clade: Monocots
- Clade: Commelinids
- Order: Arecales
- Family: Arecaceae
- Genus: Physokentia
- Species: P. thurstonii

Binomial name
- Physokentia thurstonii (Becc.) Becc.

Species of palm

Physokentia thurstonii is a species of flowering plant in the family Arecaceae. It is found only in Fiji. It is threatened by habitat loss.
