= Physokentia =

Scientific classification
- Kingdom: Plantae
- Clade: Tracheophytes
- Clade: Angiosperms
- Clade: Monocots
- Clade: Commelinids
- Order: Arecales
- Family: Arecaceae
- Subfamily: Arecoideae
- Tribe: Areceae
- Subtribe: Basseliniinae
- Genus: Physokentia; Becc.

Synonyms
- Goniosperma Burret; Goniocladus Burret

Genus of palms

Physokentia is a genus of flowering plant in the palm family, native to certain islands of the western Pacific.

== Description ==
This genus contains the following species: The relationships between Physokentia and some other genera of the tribe Basseliniinae particularly the New Caledonia endemic Burretiokentia and Cyphophoenix are not clear.

== List of species ==
- Physokentia avia H.E.Moore - Bismarck Archipelago
- Physokentia dennisii H.E.Moore - Solomon Islands
- Physokentia insolita H.E.Moore - Solomon Islands
- Physokentia petiolata (Burret) D.Fuller - Fiji
- Physokentia tete (Becc.) Becc. - Vanuatu
- Physokentia thurstonii (Becc.) Becc. - Vanuatu
- Physokentia whitmorei H.E.Moore - Solomon Islands
