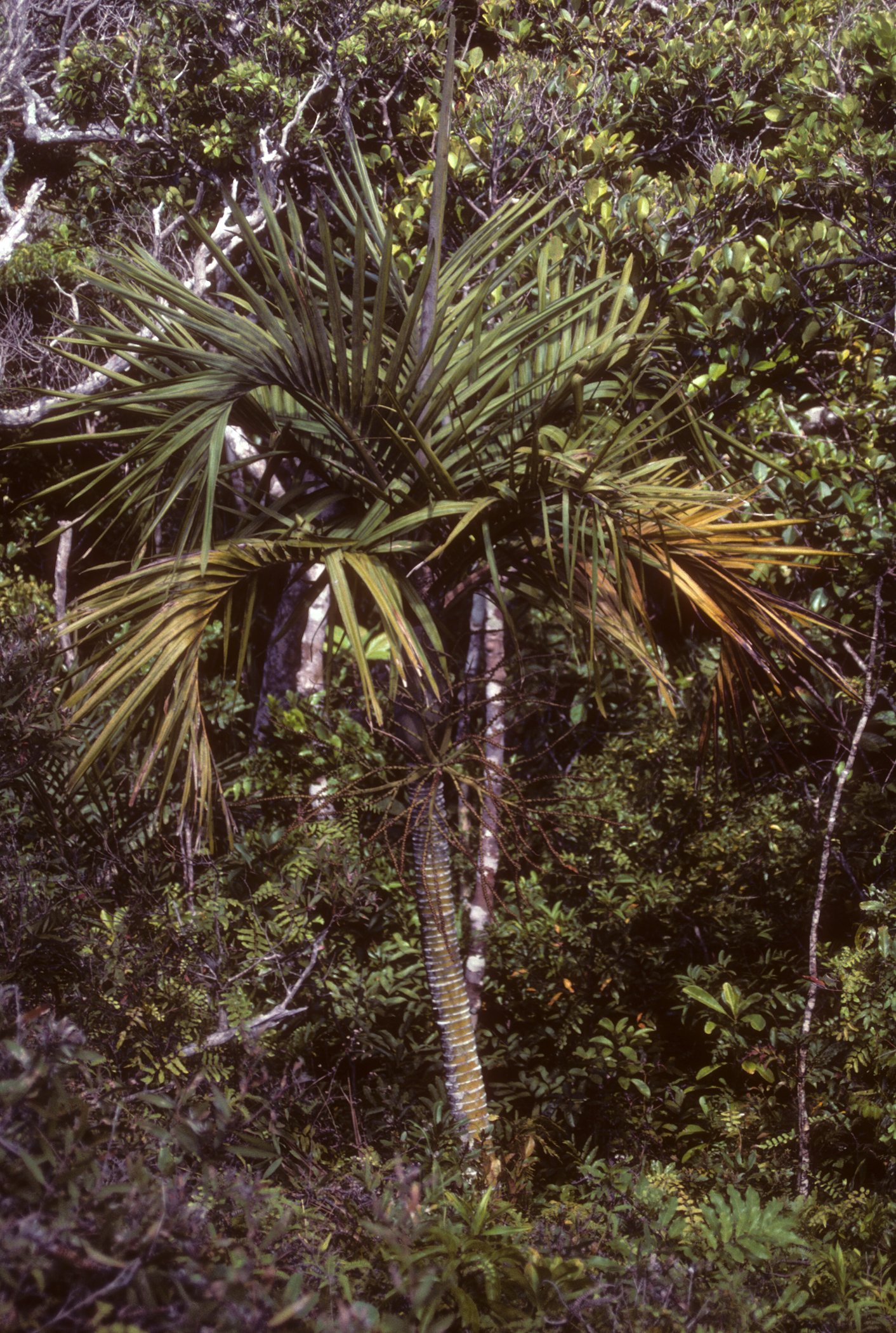

Conservation status
- Endangered (IUCN 3.1)

Scientific classification
- Kingdom: Plantae
- Clade: Tracheophytes
- Clade: Angiosperms
- Clade: Monocots
- Clade: Commelinids
- Order: Arecales
- Family: Arecaceae
- Genus: Cyphophoenix
- Species: C. elegans

Binomial name
- Cyphophoenix elegans (Brongn. & Gris) H.Wendl. ex Salomon, 1887

Synonyms
- Kentia elegans Brongn. & Gris

= Cyphophoenix elegans =

Species of palm

Cyphophoenix elegans is a species of flowering plant in the family Arecaceae. It is a palm tree found only in New Caledonia.
