= Cyphophoenix fulcita =

Scientific classification
- Kingdom: Plantae
- Clade: Tracheophytes
- Clade: Angiosperms
- Clade: Monocots
- Clade: Commelinids
- Order: Arecales
- Family: Arecaceae
- Genus: Cyphophoenix
- Species: C. fulcita

Binomial name
- Cyphophoenix fulcita (Brongn.) H.Wendl. ex Salomon

Synonyms
- Campecarpus fulcitus

Species of palm

Cyphophoenix fulcita is a species of plant in the palm family native to New Caledonia. It was previously placed in the genus Campecarpus.

== Description ==
The trunk is solitary to 15 m in height, at 13 cm wide, supported by a nearly 2 m tall mass of stilt roots. Prominently ringed by scars, the trunks are topped off by a tall green to white crownshaft with a bulging base. The leaves are pinnate up to 3 m long with 1 m long, single-fold, dark green leaflets; rachis and petiole scaly to tomentose.

The inflorescence is interfoliar, once or twice branched and hairy. The male and female flowers are borne in triads at the base of the rachilla and are solitary or in pairs towards the end. The fruit is slightly ovoid, epicarp smooth, mesocarp fleshy and fibrous, with one similarly shaped seed.

== Distribution and habitat ==
It is restricted to New Caledonia's southern end where it grows in low, wet, mountainous rain forest and on serpentinite rocks.
