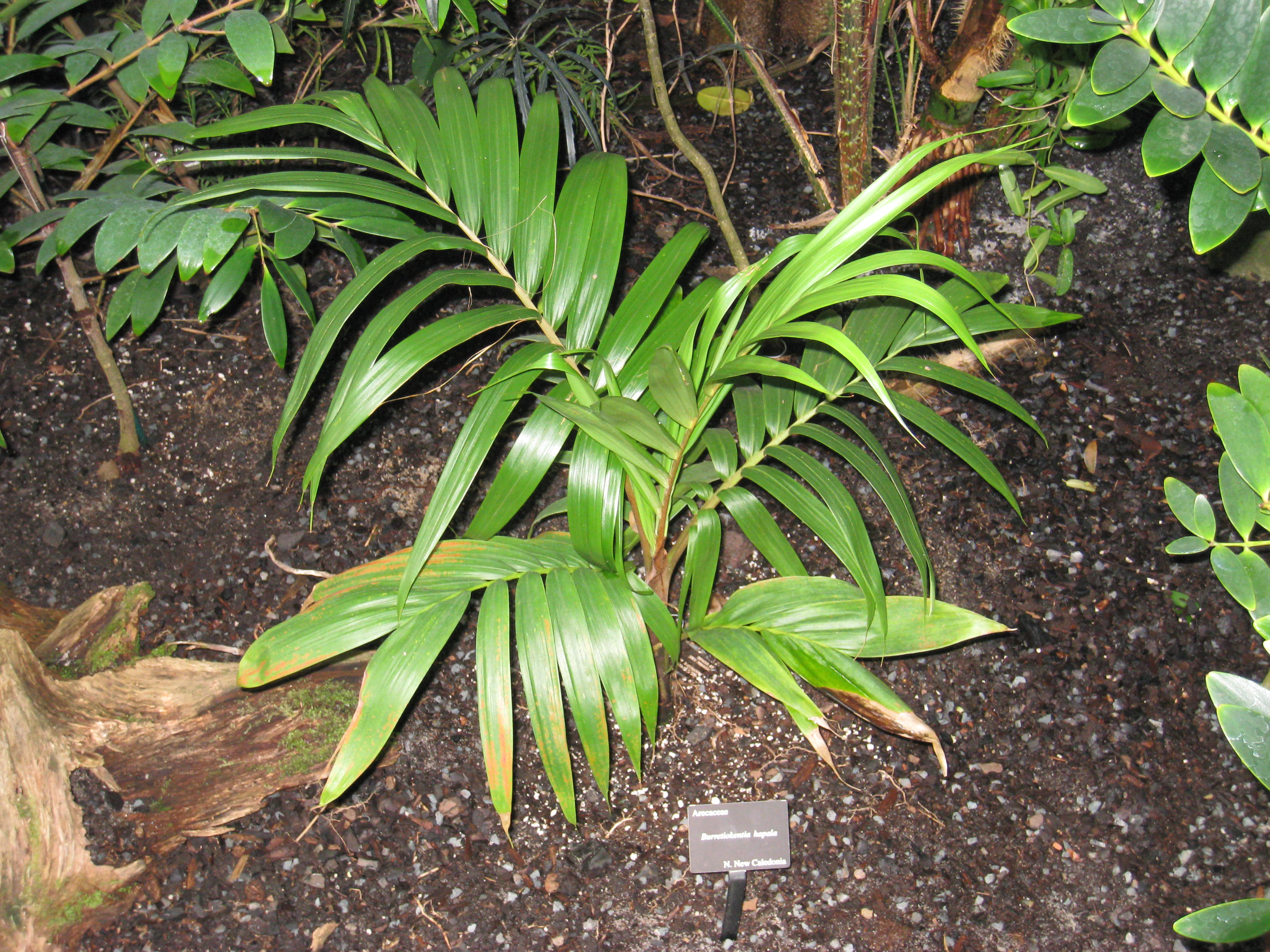
- Burretiokentia hapala

Scientific classification
- Kingdom: Plantae
- Clade: Tracheophytes
- Clade: Angiosperms
- Clade: Monocots
- Clade: Commelinids
- Order: Arecales
- Family: Arecaceae
- Subfamily: Arecoideae
- Tribe: Areceae
- Subtribe: Basseliniinae
- Genus: Burretiokentia; Pic.Serm.

Species
- See text

Synonyms
- Rhynchocarpa Becc. 1920

= Burretiokentia =

Genus of palms

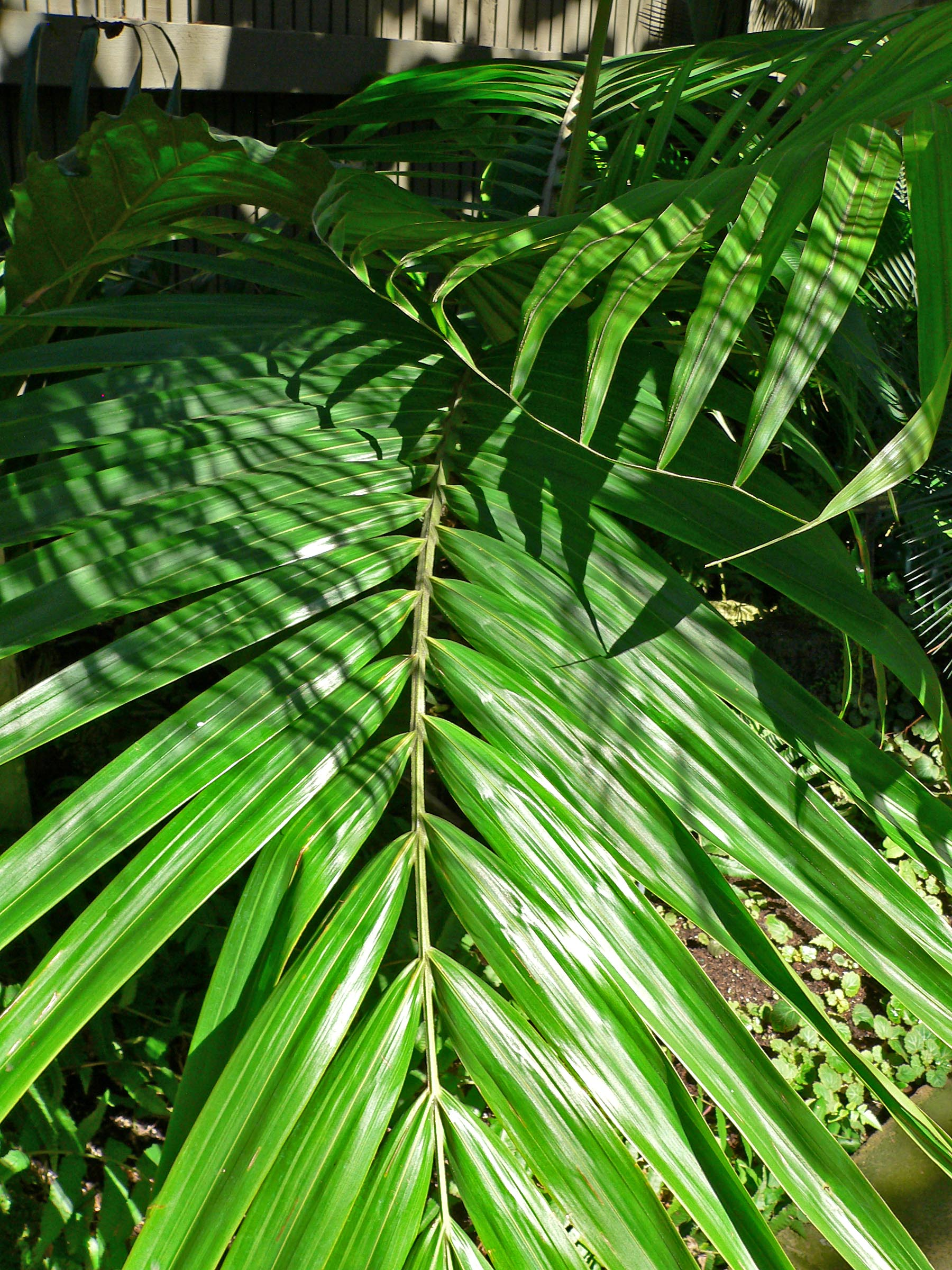
Burretiokentia vieillardii

Burretiokentia is a genus of palms (Arecaceae) endemic to New Caledonia containing five species. The relationships between Burretiokentia and some other genera of the tribe Basseliniinae including Physokentia and the New Caledonia endemic Cyphophoenix are not clear.

== List of species ==
- Burretiokentia dumasii
- Burretiokentia grandiflora
- Burretiokentia hapala
- Burretiokentia koghiensis
- Burretiokentia vieillardii
