= Physokentia tete =

Conservation status
- Near Threatened (IUCN 2.3)

Scientific classification
- Kingdom: Plantae
- Clade: Tracheophytes
- Clade: Angiosperms
- Clade: Monocots
- Clade: Commelinids
- Order: Arecales
- Family: Arecaceae
- Genus: Physokentia
- Species: P. tete

Binomial name
- Physokentia tete (Beccari) Beccari

Species of palm

Physokentia tete is a species of flowering plant in the family Arecaceae. It is found only in Vanuatu. It is threatened by habitat loss.
