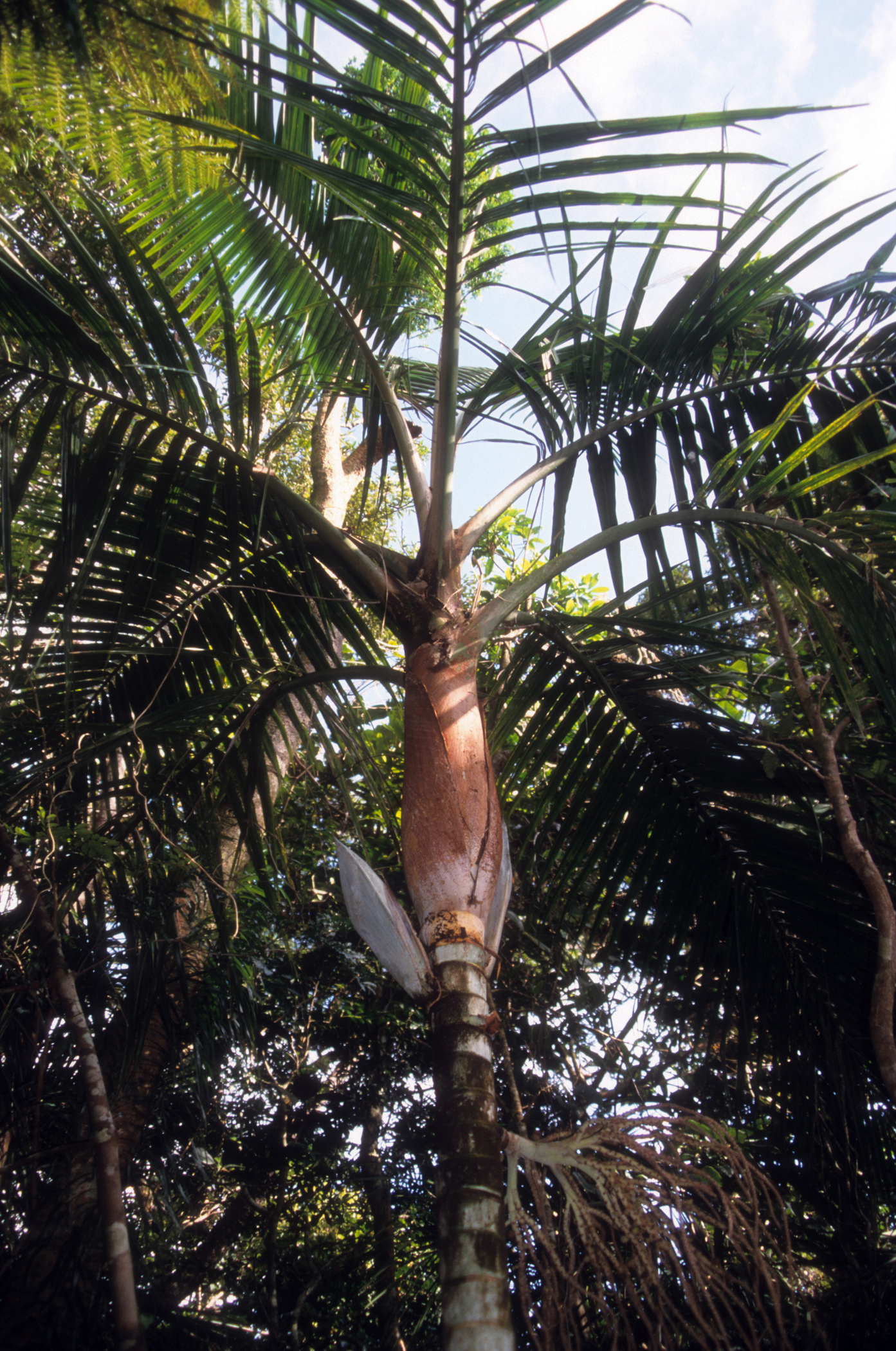
- Cyphophoenix alba, Mt. Panié, New Caledonia

Scientific classification
- Kingdom: Plantae
- Clade: Tracheophytes
- Clade: Angiosperms
- Clade: Monocots
- Clade: Commelinids
- Order: Arecales
- Family: Arecaceae
- Genus: Cyphophoenix
- Species: C. alba

Binomial name
- Cyphophoenix alba (H.E.Moore) Pintaud & W.J.Baker

Synonyms
- Veillonia alba

= Cyphophoenix alba =

Species of palm

Cyphophoenix alba is a species of palm in the family Arecaceae endemic to New Caledonia. It was previously placed in the genus Veillonia.

== Description ==
The ringed trunks are solitary, to 15 cm wide and, in habitat, grow to 15 m tall. White to gray at the swollen base, new trunk growth is light green up to the loose crownshaft which is densely covered in white wax and red to brown scales. The leaf is pinnately compound, 3 meters long on 60 cm, scaly petioles. The rachis may be scale bearing, the meter long leaflets regularly emerging from it, each with one fold, scaly and acuminate. The midrib and lateral veins are prominent, the transverse veinlets are not.

The flowering branch is borne beneath the crownshaft, branched to one or two orders, erect in bud and becoming pendulous in fruit. The short peduncle is waxy and covered in hairs, the enclosing prophyll is similarly covered, two keeled and beaked. The rachis is longer than the peduncle with spirally arranged, conspicuous bracts subtending long, tapering rachillae. These branchlets are stiff with prominent bracts subtending triads in their lower half with pairs or lone staminate flowers on the top.

The staminate flowers have three pointed sepals and as many valvate petals; the six stamens have strongly inflexed filaments with oblong dorsifixed anthers carrying elliptic pollen with finely reticulate, tectate exine. The pistillate flowers are larger with broadly imbricate sepals and valvate petals; there are three toothlike staminodes borne at the side of the ovoid, uniovulate gynoecium. The three stigmas are prominent and reflexed nearing antithesis; the ovule is pendulous. The ovoid fruit is red to brown at maturity carrying one seed with a basal embryo.

== Distribution and habitat ==
It is found on Mont Panié in New Caledonian rain forest in gneissic and schistose soils from 200 – 600 m above sea level.
