= Physokentia dennisii =

Conservation status
- Data Deficient (IUCN 2.3)

Scientific classification
- Kingdom: Plantae
- Clade: Tracheophytes
- Clade: Angiosperms
- Clade: Monocots
- Clade: Commelinids
- Order: Arecales
- Family: Arecaceae
- Genus: Physokentia
- Species: P. dennisii

Binomial name
- Physokentia dennisii H.E.Moore

Species of palm

Physokentia dennisii is a species of palm tree in the family Arecaceae. It is endemic to the Solomon Islands where it is threatened by habitat loss.

Physokentia dennisii is named after Geoffrey F.C. Dennis (1918-1995), an Australian born botanist and resident of the Solomon Islands since 1946. This palm is a handsome species with a solitary slender bright green, ringed trunk supported by numerous slender stilt roots to a height of about 2 metres above ground in mature specimens. It has a light green crownshaft bearing long arching leaves with numerous pointed leaflets. The inflorescence is ivory-colored, and globular fruits ripen black. It can grow to over 10 metres and it is an understorey palm, even at maturity.
