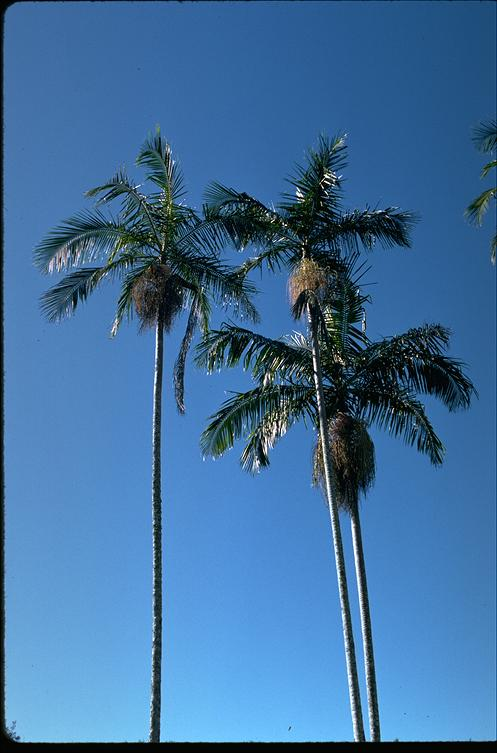
- Growing on the Gold Coast, Queensland

Conservation status
- Least Concern (NCA)
- Least Concern (IUCN 3.1)

Scientific classification
- Kingdom: Plantae
- Clade: Tracheophytes
- Clade: Angiosperms
- Clade: Monocots
- Clade: Commelinids
- Order: Arecales
- Family: Arecaceae
- Genus: Archontophoenix
- Species: A. cunninghamiana

Binomial name
- Archontophoenix cunninghamiana (H.Wendl.) H.Wendl. & Drude

Synonyms
- Loroma cunninghamiana (H.Wendl.) O.F.Cook; Ptychosperma cunninghamianum H.Wendl.; Jessenia amazonum Drude; Loroma amethystina O.F.Cook; Seaforthia elegans Hook.

= Archontophoenix cunninghamiana =

Bangalow palm

Species of palm

Archontophoenix cunninghamiana – commonly known as Bangalow palm, king palm, Illawarra palm or piccabeen palm – is a tree in the palm family Arecaceae, which is endemic to the east coast of New South Wales and Queensland, Australia.

== Description ==
The Bangalow palm has a single trunk growing up to 30 m (98 ft) tall and a diameter of 30 cm (12 in). The trunk is swollen at the base and is marked by prominent leaf scars at regular intervals along its length. The crownshaft is around 140 cm (55 in) long and is green or purple green. Around 9 to 12 leaves (or fronds) make up the crown, each about 4–4.5 m (13–15 ft) long and with around 90 pairs of leaflets. The fronds usually have a half-twist so that the leaflets at the distal end are more or less vertical. The leaflets measure up to 100 cm (39 in) long and 10 cm (3.9 in) wide.

The inflorescence is a much-branched panicle arising from the base of the crownshaft and measuring up to 150 cm (59 in) long. The flowers are pink to lilac or purple; the staminate (functionally male) flowers measure up to 6 mm (0.24 in) long and the pistillate (functionally female) flowers are around 5 mm (0.20 in) long.

The globose fruit is a drupe to around 10–15 mm (0.4–0.6 in) diameter. They are bright red when ripe and contain a single seed.

== Taxonomy ==
This species was first described in 1858 by the German botanist Hermann Wendland, who gave it the name Ptychosperma cunninghamianum. Seventeen years later, working with his countryman Carl Georg Oscar Drude, Wendland reviewed his description and gave the species the current combination. Their work was published in the journal Linnaea: ein Journal für die Botanik in ihrem ganzen Umfange, oder Beiträge zur Pflanzenkunde in 1875.

=== Etymology ===
The genus name is derived from the Ancient Greek ἄρχων (árkhōn), meaning 'chieftain' or 'ruler', combined with the palm genus Phoenix. It was created by Wendland and Drude and refers to their perceived 'regal stature' of these palms. The species epithet cunninghamiana was coined by Wendland to honour the English botanist Allan Cunningham.

== Distribution ==
The native range of the Bangalow palm is from Mount Elliot, near Townsville in tropical Queensland, southwards in coastal and sub-coastal areas to Bateman's Bay in southern New South Wales. It grows in rainforest and wet scleophyll forest, in swampy areas and beside rivers and creeks, at altitudes ranging from sea level to 1,200 m (3,940 ft).

=== Origin ===
The genus Archontophoenix belongs to the subtribe Archontophoenicinae, which is distributed between eastern Australia, New Zealand, New Caledonia, Lord Howe Island and Norfolk Island, and it is believed that this region is where the all the included species originated, including A. cunninghamiana. This is supported by the lack of any close relatives of the group in the regions to the north of Australia, e.g. Indonesia.

== Invasive potential ==
It has become a noxious weed in many areas where it has been used as an ornamental plant. In southern Brazil, it has become an invasive species, and it has been suggested that it benefits from the earlier local extinction of the native palm Euterpe edulis.

In New Zealand, A. cunninghamiana could invade native forests, since it has the same ecological requirements as the native nīkau palm. The Department of Conservation (New Zealand) has included A. cunninghamiana in its List of Environmental Weeds in New Zealand 2024. The Auckland Council has declared A. cunninghamiana to be a pest species, and has introduced restrictions on the movement of the plant within the Hauraki Gulf Controlled Area.

In the United States, the palm is commonly cultivated in California from San Luis Obispo south to the Mexican border and in much of central and southern Florida.

== Gallery ==
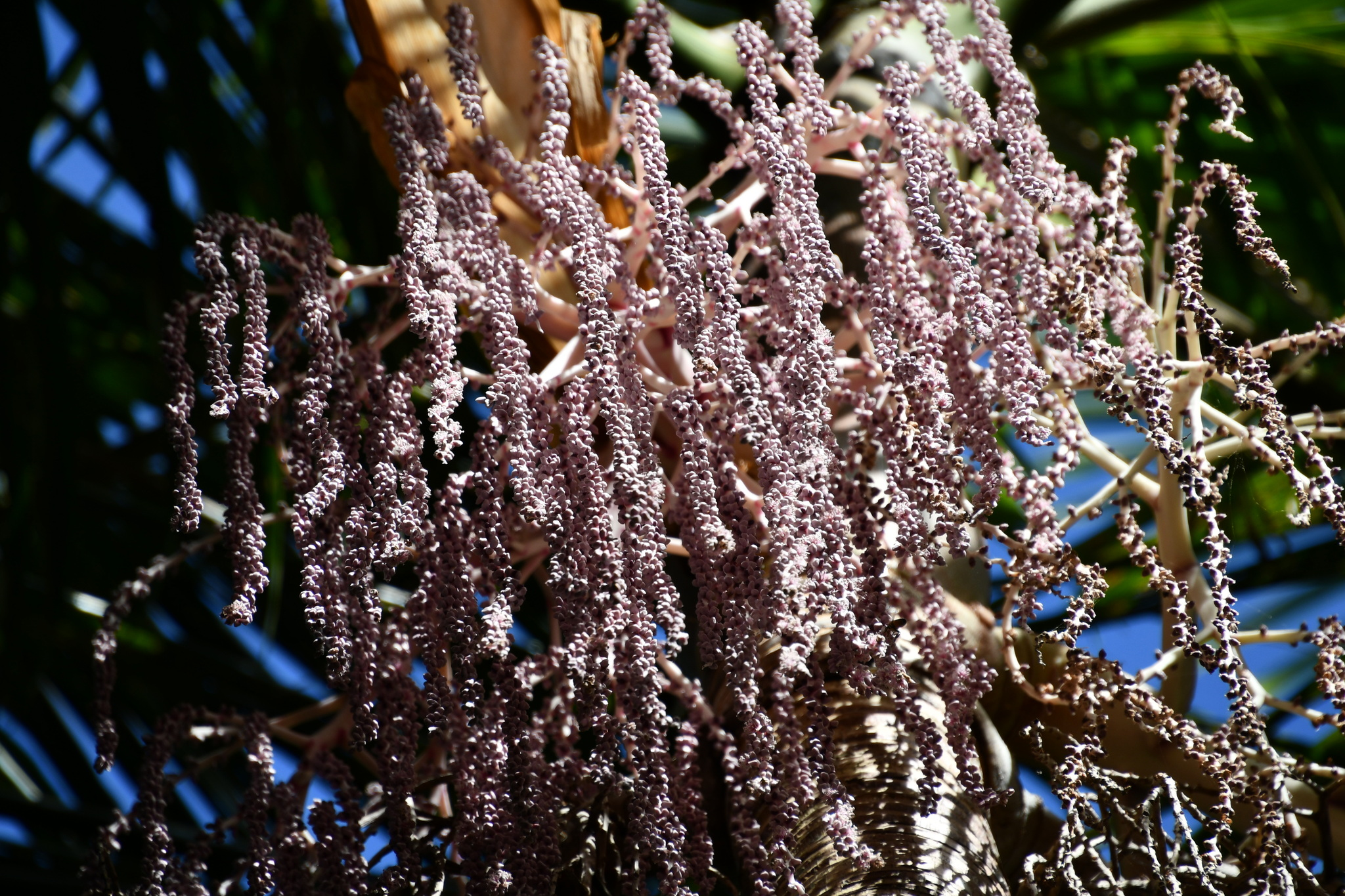
Inflorescence

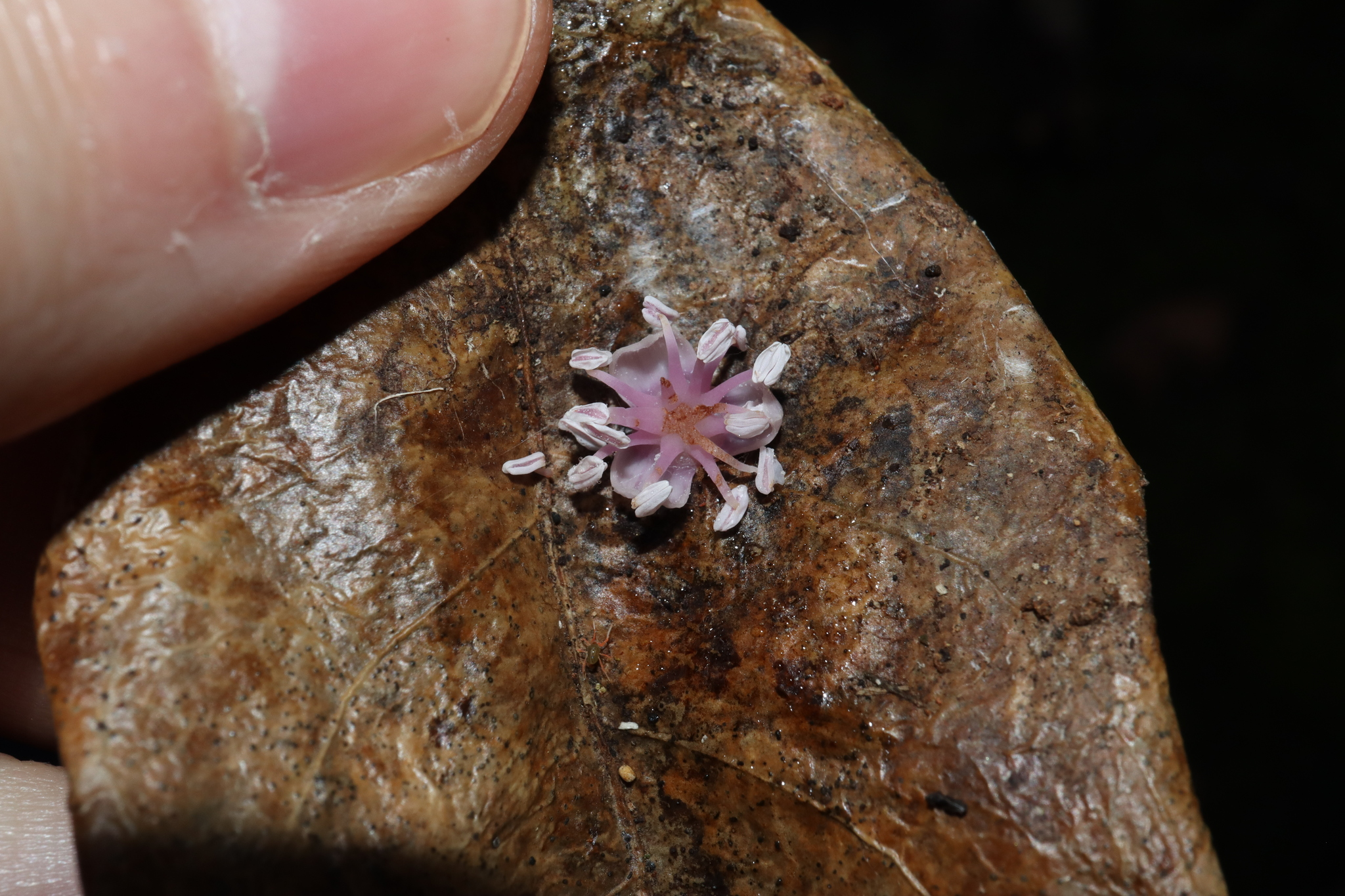
Flower

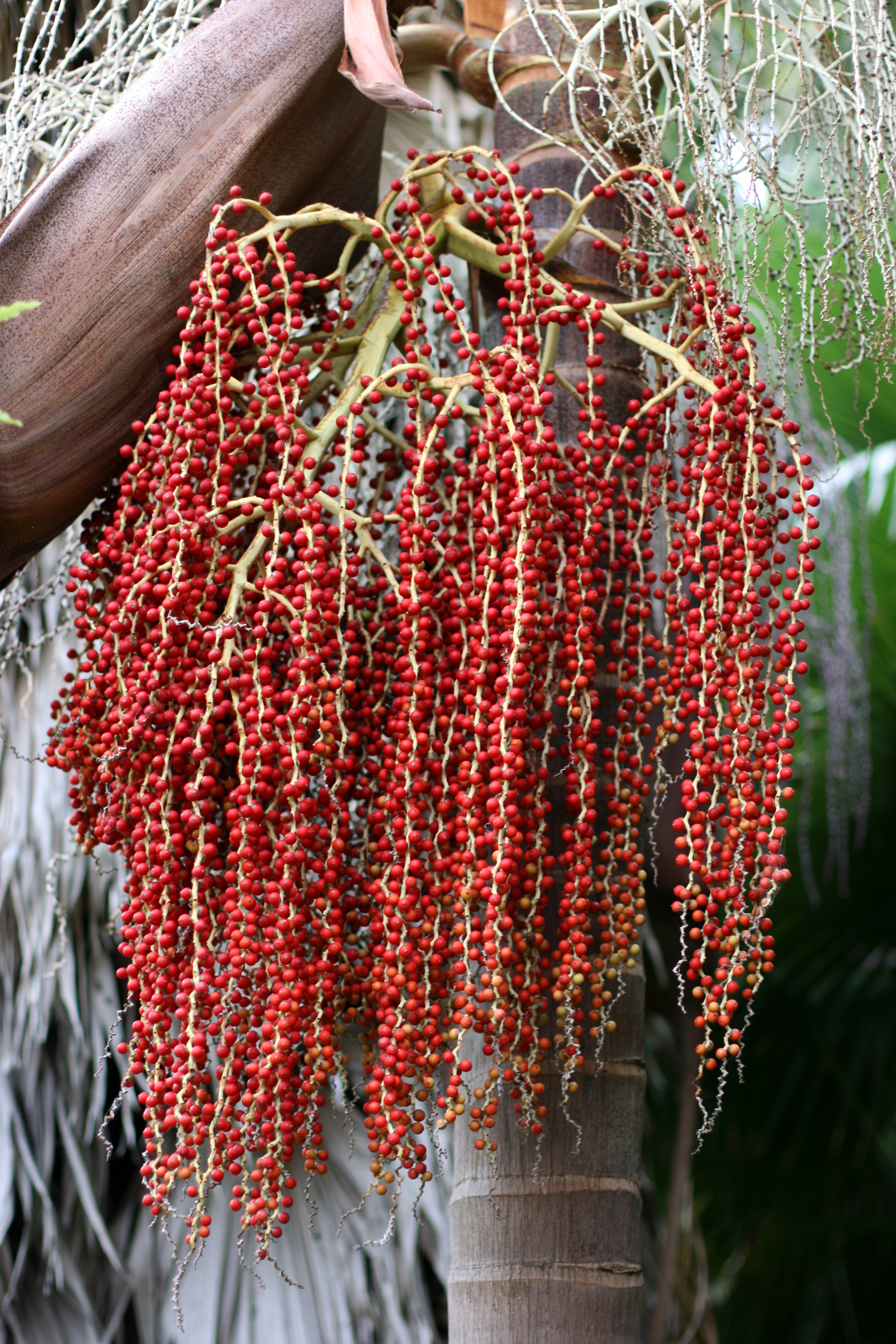
Infructescence

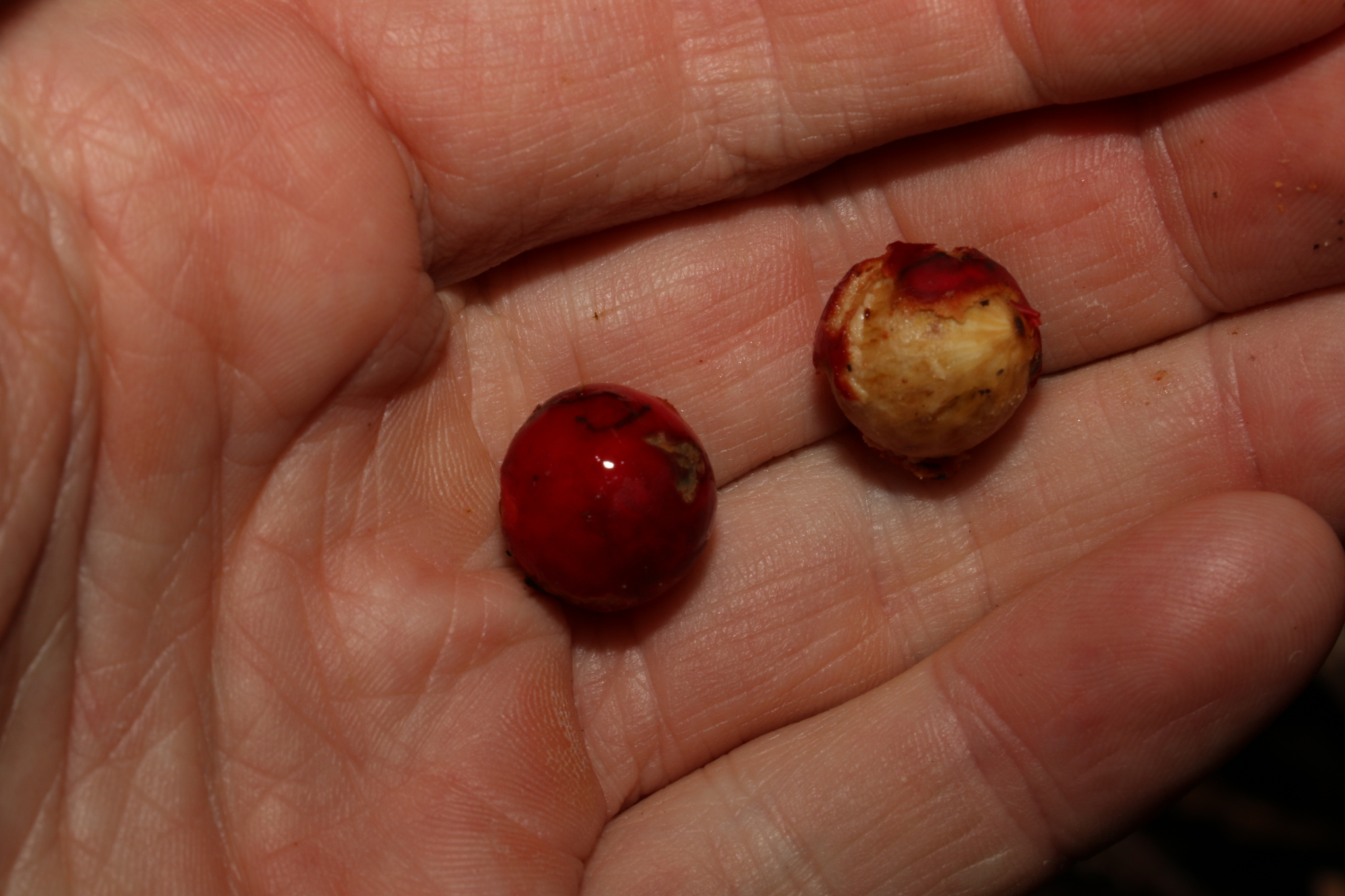
Fruit

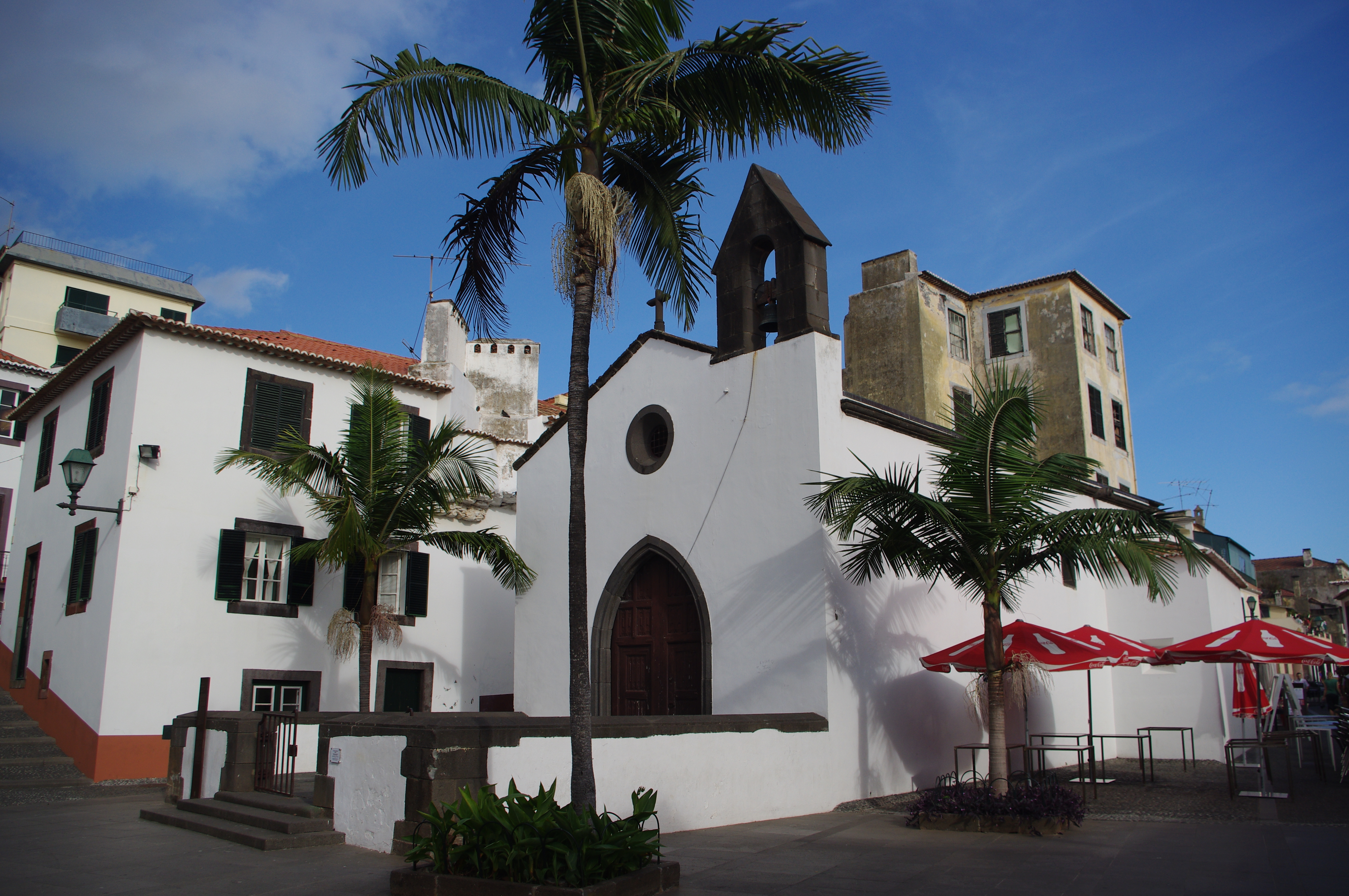
Cultivated in Portugal

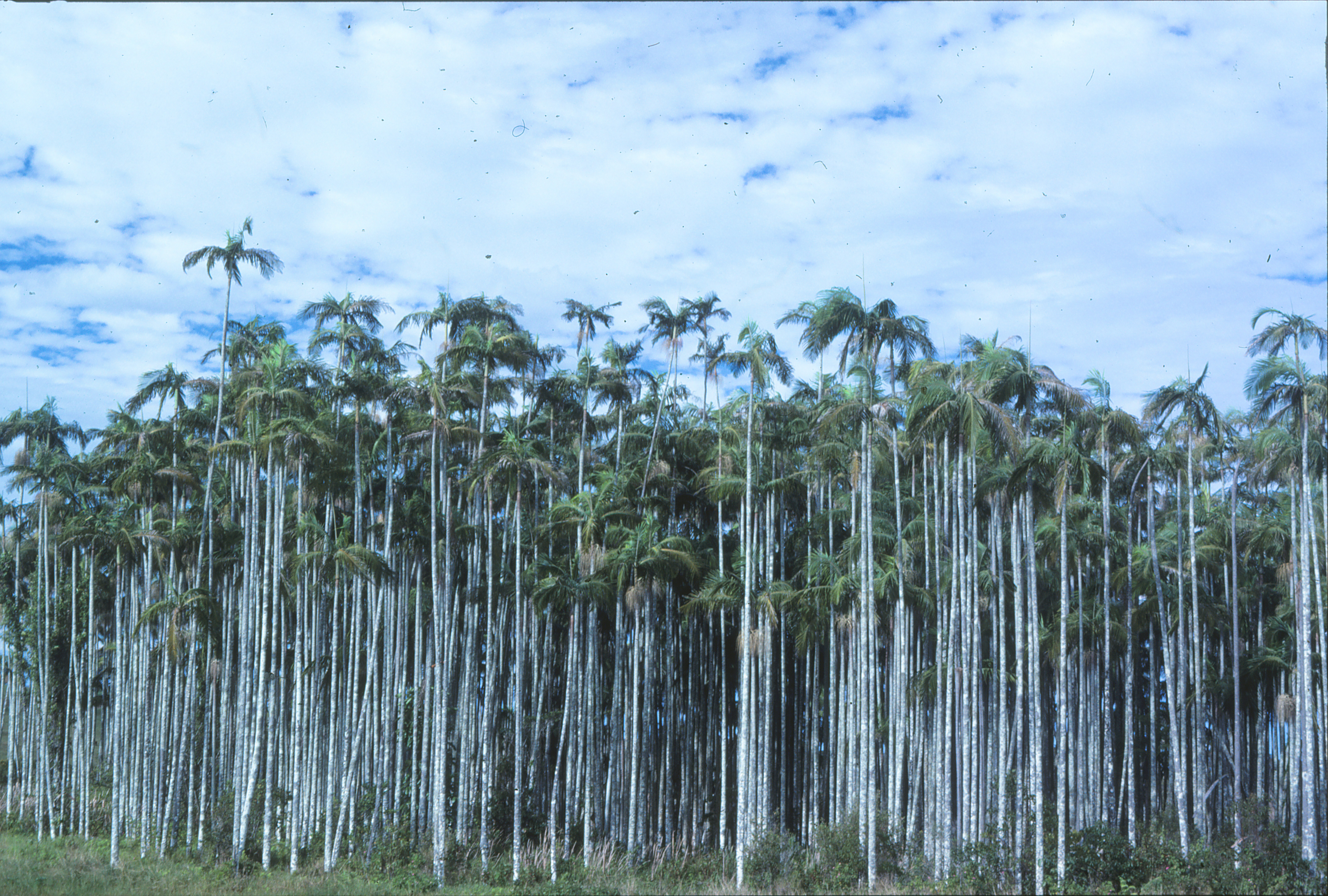
Byron Bay, NSW

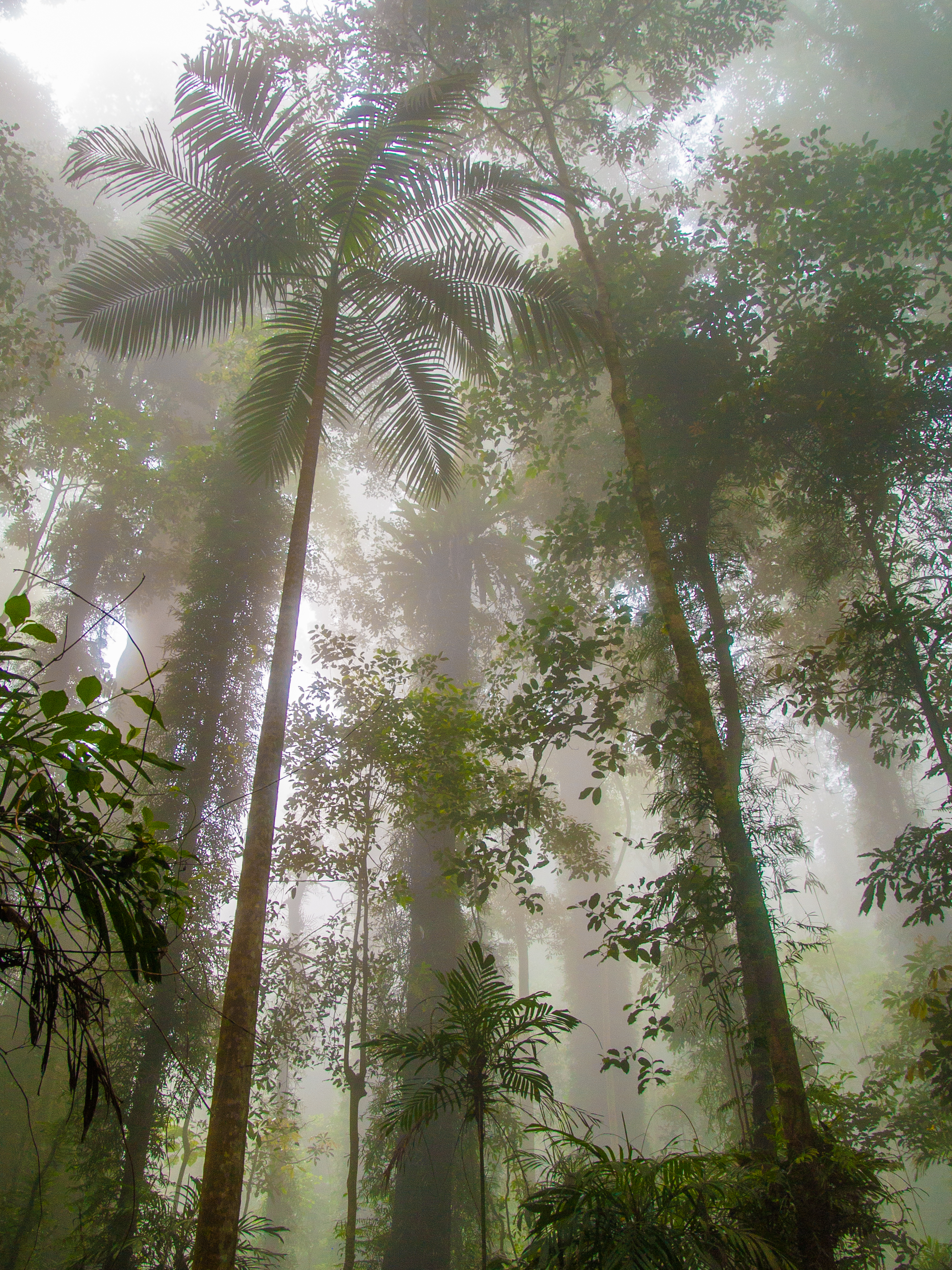
Dorrigo National Park, NSW.
