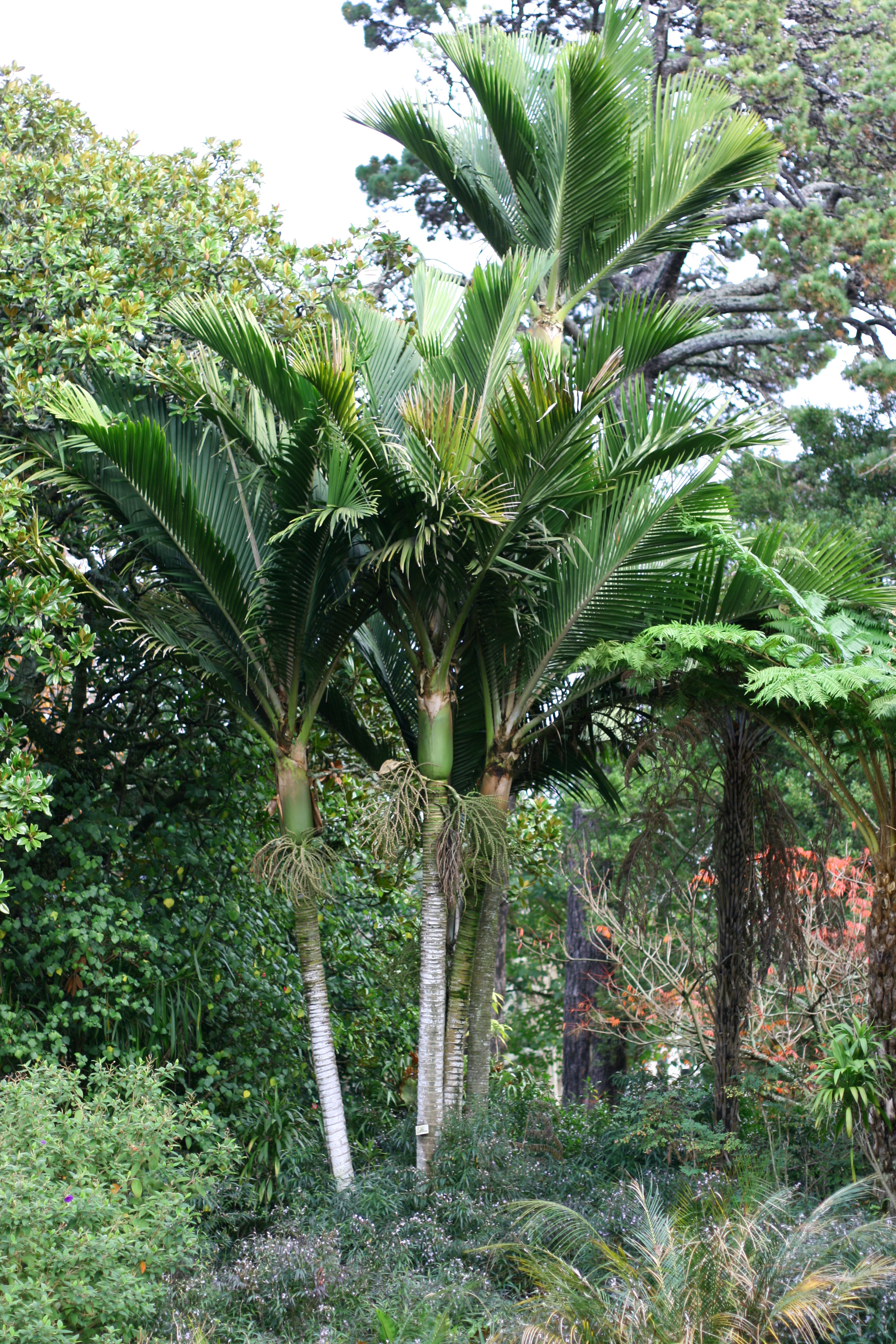
- Rhopalostylis baueri

Scientific classification
- Kingdom: Plantae
- Clade: Tracheophytes
- Clade: Angiosperms
- Clade: Monocots
- Clade: Commelinids
- Order: Arecales
- Family: Arecaceae
- Subfamily: Arecoideae
- Tribe: Areceae
- Subtribe: Rhopalostylidinae

Genera
- Hedyscepe; Rhopalostylis

= Rhopalostylidinae =

Subtribe of palms

Rhopalostylidinae is a botanical subtribe consisting of two genera of palms from Australia and New Zealand, Hedyscepe and Rhopalostylis. These two genera were formerly included in Archontophoenicinae, to which they are morphologically similar (Dowe 2010:233), until a recent revision (Dransfield, Uhl et al., 2005).

== Description ==
The palms in this subtribe are medium-sized palms, with well-developed, distinct crownshafts and strictly pinnate leaves with generally short and massive petioles. The inflorescences are branched to two or three orders, with the prophyll and penduncular bracts similar (Uhl and Dransfield 1987:367).

== Genera ==
Image	Scientific name	Description
	R. baueri, the Norfolk palm or Niau, (Norfolk Island, Australia, and Raoul Island in the Kermadec group north of New Zealand); R. sapida, the Nikau palm, (New Zealand.)	The leaves of Rhopalostylis tend to be held rigidly upright, especially in R. sapida from the northern North Island, making the palm somewhat resemble a feather duster.
	H. canterburyana the Big Mountain palm, (grows on mountain cliffs overlooking the sea on Lord Howe Island, Australia.)	Some studies throw doubt on the inclusion of Hedyscepe as a member of the Rhopalostylidinae. In some (but not all) molecular phylogenetic analyses, Hedyscepe is nested in the New Caledonia endemic Basselinia.
