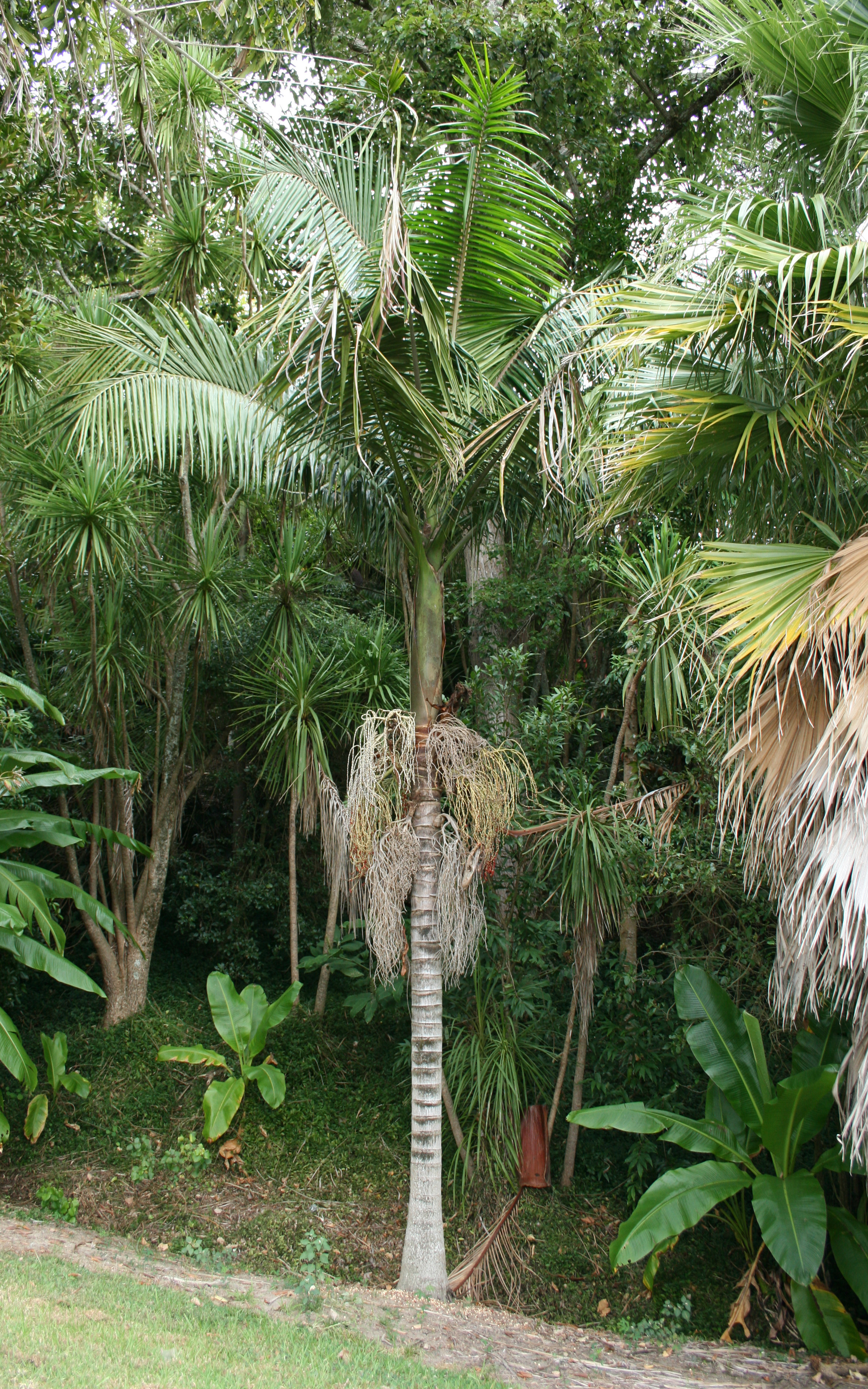
- Archontophoenix cunninghamiana

Scientific classification
- Kingdom: Plantae
- Clade: Tracheophytes
- Clade: Angiosperms
- Clade: Monocots
- Clade: Commelinids
- Order: Arecales
- Family: Arecaceae
- Subfamily: Arecoideae
- Tribe: Areceae
- Subtribe: Archontophoenicinae; J.Dransf. & N.W.Uhl

Genera
- Actinorhytis H.Wendl. & Drude; Archontophoenix H.Wendl. & Drude; Chambeyronia Vieill. (synonyms Actinokentia Dammer, Kentiopsis Brongn., and Mackeea H.E.Moore); Wallaceodoxa Heatubun & W.J.Baker

= Archontophoenicinae =

Subtribe of palms

Archontophoenicinae is a botanical subtribe consisting of several genera of palms, namely Archontophoenix from Queensland and New South Wales and Actinokentia, Chambeyronia and Kentiopsis from New Caledonia. NCBI Taxonomy Browser also includes the monotypic genus Wallaceodoxa from the western New Guinea. Two other genera, Hedyscepe from Lord Howe Island and Rhopalostylis from Norfolk Island, Australia, and New Zealand (including the Kermadec Islands) were formerly included in this subtribe, but have now been separated out to form the subtribe Rhopalostylidinae (Dransfield, Uhl et al., 2005). Phylogenetic relationships between the four genera are unresolved. Actinokentia and Kentiopsis are now considered synonyms of Chambeyronia.

== Description ==
The palms in this subtribe are medium-sized palms, with well-developed, distinct crownshafts and strictly pinnate leaves with generally short and massive petioles. The inflorescences are branched to two or three orders, with the prophyll and penduncular bracts similar. The subtribe is homogenous compared to other subtribes of the Areceae. All the genera have more than six stamens. The New Caledonian genera have distinctive leaf anatomy and may share a common ancestor (Uhl and Dransfield 1987:367).
