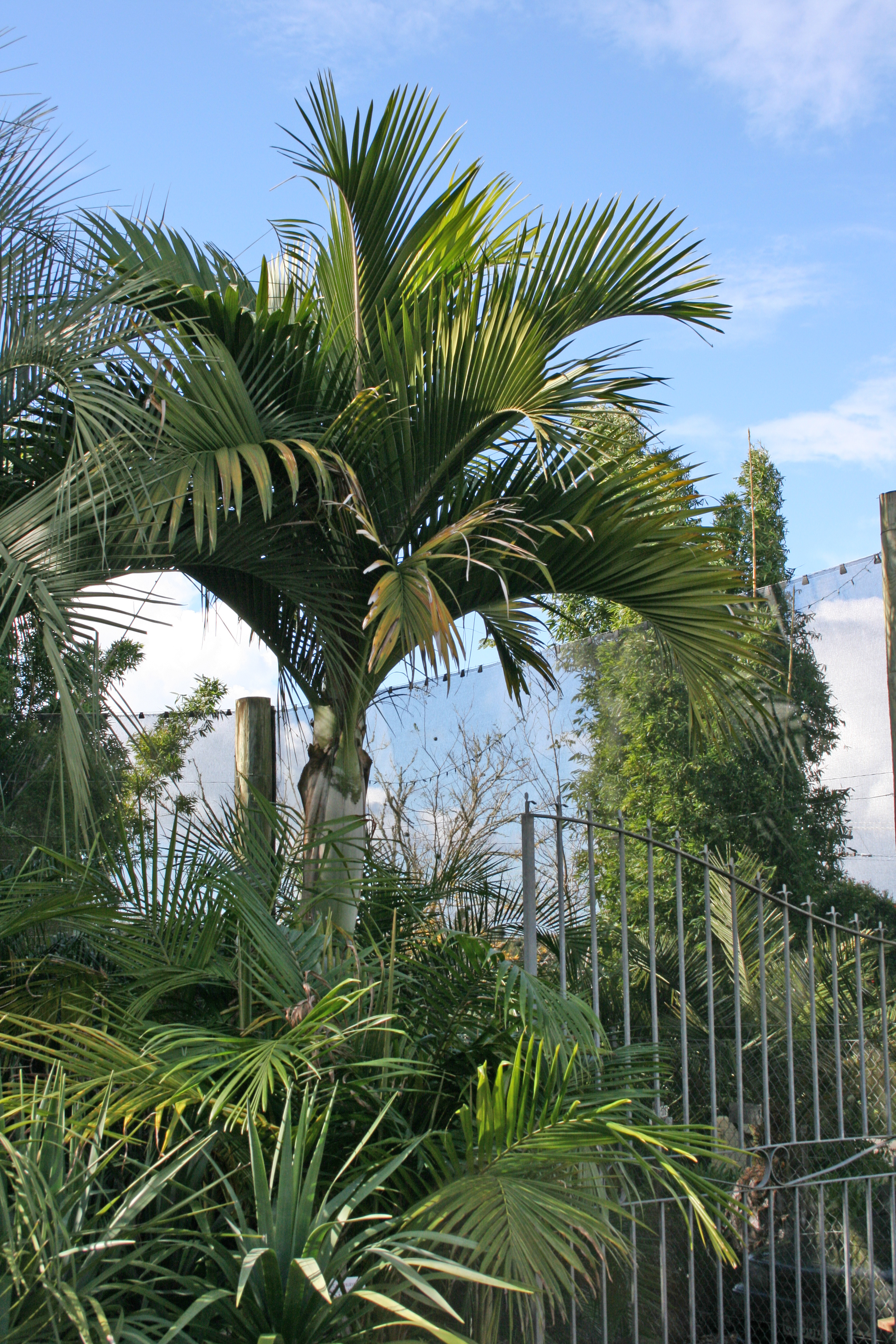

Conservation status
- Vulnerable (IUCN 2.3)

Scientific classification
- Kingdom: Plantae
- Clade: Embryophytes
- Clade: Tracheophytes
- Clade: Spermatophytes
- Clade: Angiosperms
- Clade: Monocots
- Clade: Commelinids
- Order: Arecales
- Family: Arecaceae
- Tribe: Areceae
- Subtribe: Rhopalostylidinae
- Genus: Hedyscepe; H.Wendl. & Drude
- Species: H. canterburyana

Binomial name
- Hedyscepe canterburyana (C. Moore & F.Muell.) H. Wendl. & Drude
- H. canterburyana is endemic to Lord Howe Island

= Hedyscepe =

Genus of palms

Hedyscepe canterburyana, the big mountain palm or umbrella palm, is the sole species in the genus Hedyscepe of the family Arecaceae. It is endemic to Lord Howe Island, Australia and is threatened by habitat loss. It is a solitary palm with a distinct crownshaft, and bears unisexual flowers of both sexes. With the Rhopalostylis palms of Norfolk Island and New Zealand it forms the botanic subtribe Rhopalostylidinae. If differs from Rhopalostylis in minor floral details including having more than six stamens, and in being protandrous rather than protogynous. The two genera were formerly included in Archontophoenicinae until a recent revision (Dransfield, Uhl et al., 2005). In some (but not all) molecular phylogenetic analyses, Hedyscepe was found to be nested in the New Caledonia endemic Basselinia.

== Description ==
Hedyscepe canterburyana is a slow-growing palm up to 10 metres (33 ft) tall which grows on mountain forests, cliffs, and exposed ridges overlooking the sea, at about 400–750 m (1,310–2,460 ft) of altitude. It has a slender, close-ringed trunk, a prominent silvery crownshaft and a compact crown of dense, dark green, stiffly arching recurved fronds somewhat reminiscent of those of Howea belmoreana. The egg-shaped fruit are deep red when ripe, and about 4 cm long. They appear in densely bunched fruiting spikes from below the crownshaft. Each fruit contains a single seed.

== Cultivation ==
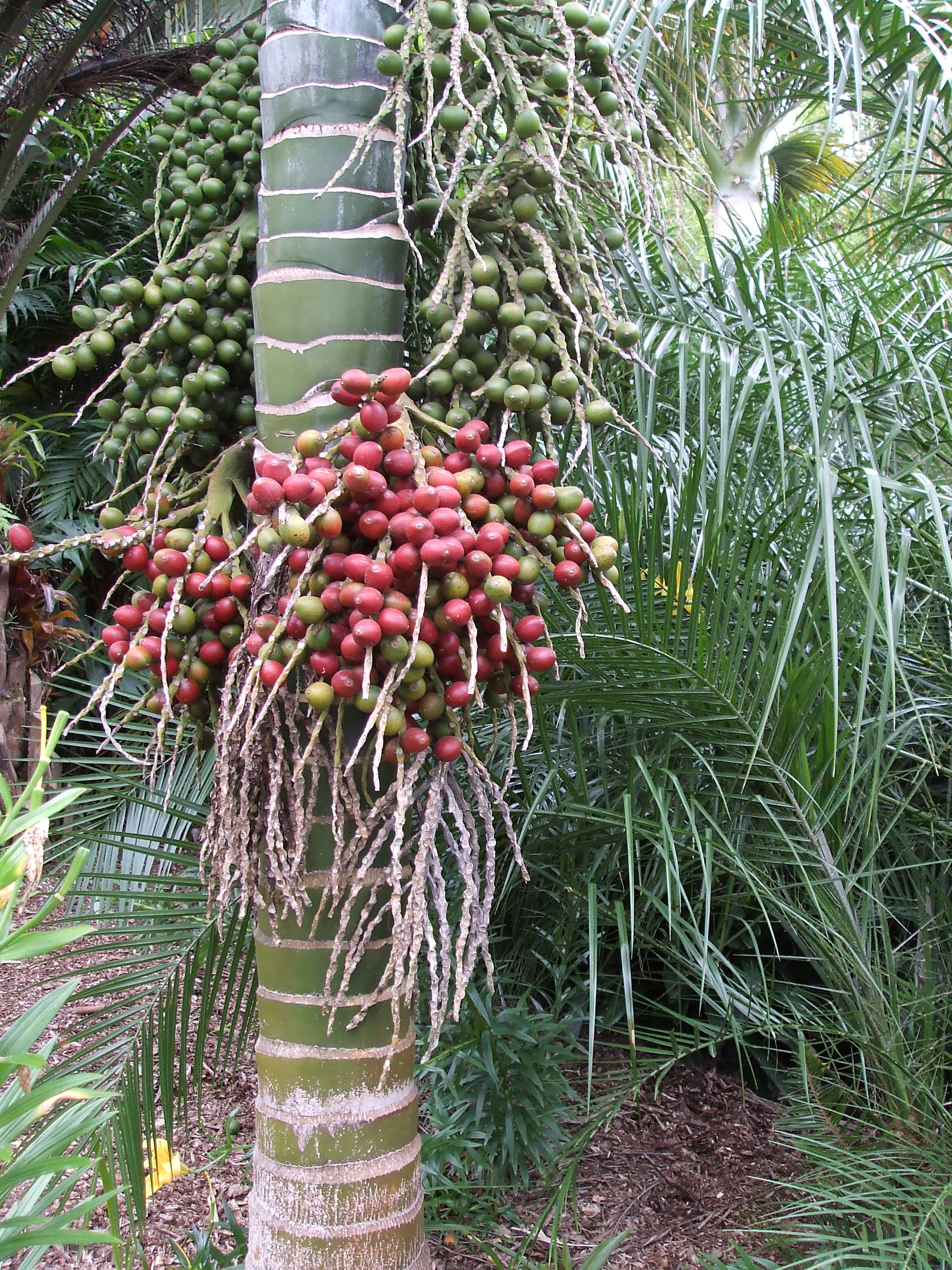
Fruits of Hedyscepe canterburyana

Lord Howe Island has a subtropical climate. Summers are mild to warm with regular rain, and winters are wetter and somewhat cooler. Average maximum temperatures range between 17 and 20 °C (63 and 68 °F) in winter and 24–27 °C (75–81 °F) in the summer. In winter, average minimum temperatures range between 12 and 15 °C (54 and 59 °F), and 18–22 °C (64–72 °F) in summer. Humidity averages in the 60 to 70 per cent range all year round.

With its arching fronds, H. canterburyana is a very attractive palm which is becoming increasingly popular among garden enthusiasts in cool subtropical and warm temperate climates. It is difficult to grow in the tropics or where nights are never cool, but does well in climates like Sydney and Auckland, and can tolerate the occasional light frost once established. It needs a rich organic soil, and shelter from sun for at least the first five years. It also does well in containers or as indoor plants where light is good. Single plants are capable of producing fertile seed. Fresh seed is slow and erratic in germination, with seedlings appearing from five to 18 months after they are sown. Fruit take up to four years to ripen and it is not easy to tell when the seeds are ripe.

== Sources ==
- Dransfield, John, Natalie W Uhl, Conny B Asmussen, William J Baker, Madeline M Harley, and Carl E Lewis 2005. 'A new phylogenetic classification of the palm family, Arecaceae'. Kew Bulletin, Vol. 60 (2005).
- Jones, David L. 1995. Palms Throughout the World. Smithsonian Institution Press, Washington D.C.
- Jones, David L. 1996. Palms in Australia. Reed Books, Melbourne.
- Krempin, Jack 1990. Palms & Cycads Around The World. Herron Books, Fortitude Valley, Queensland.
- Uhl, Natalie W. and Dransfield, John 1987. Genera Palmarum - A classification of palms based on the work of Harold E. Moore. Allen Press, Lawrence, Kansas. ISBN 0-935868-30-5 / ISBN 978-0-935868-30-2.
