= Drude (disambiguation) =

A drude is a malevolent nocturnal spirit in German folklore

Drude may also refer to:

- Drude (surname), lists bearers of the name
- Drude (crater), on the far side of the Moon
- Drude model of electrical conduction, proposed in 1900 by Paul Drude
- Drude particle, model oscillator used to simulate the effects of electronic polarizability

== See also ==
- Drood (disambiguation)
