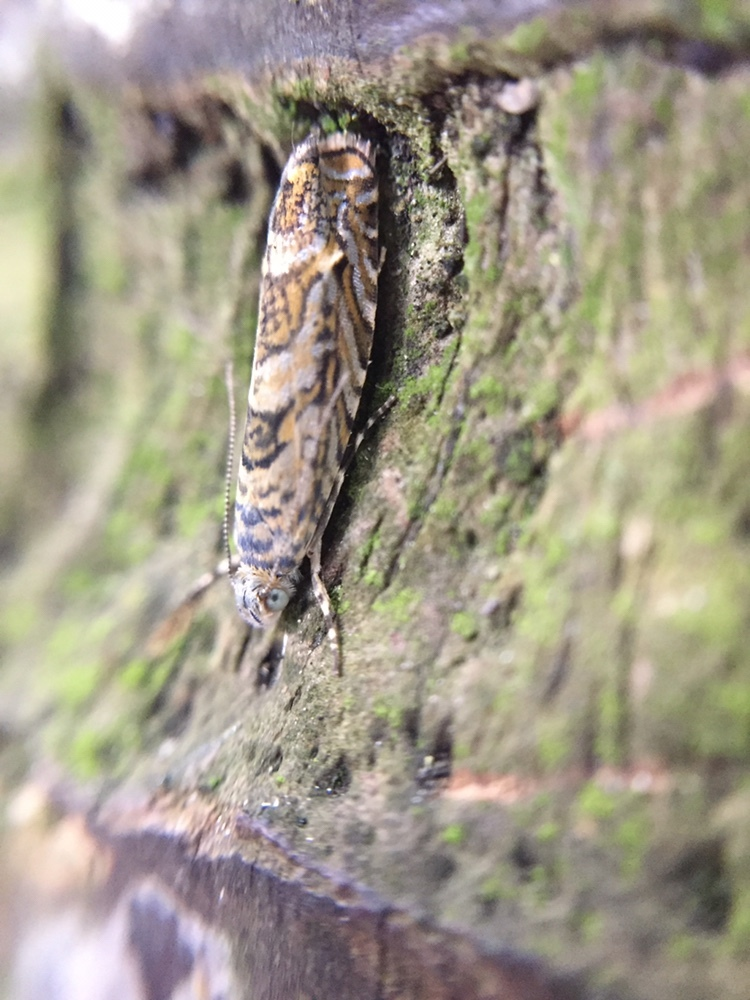

Scientific classification
- Kingdom: Animalia
- Phylum: Arthropoda
- Class: Insecta
- Order: Lepidoptera
- Family: Plutellidae
- Genus: Doxophyrtis
- Species: D. hydrocosma

Binomial name
- Doxophyrtis hydrocosma Meyrick, 1914

= Doxophyrtis hydrocosma =

Species of moth endemic to New Zealand

Doxophyrtis hydrocosma, also known as the Nikau Palm moth, is a species of moth in the family Plutellidae first described by Edward Meyrick in 1914. It is endemic to New Zealand.

== Description ==
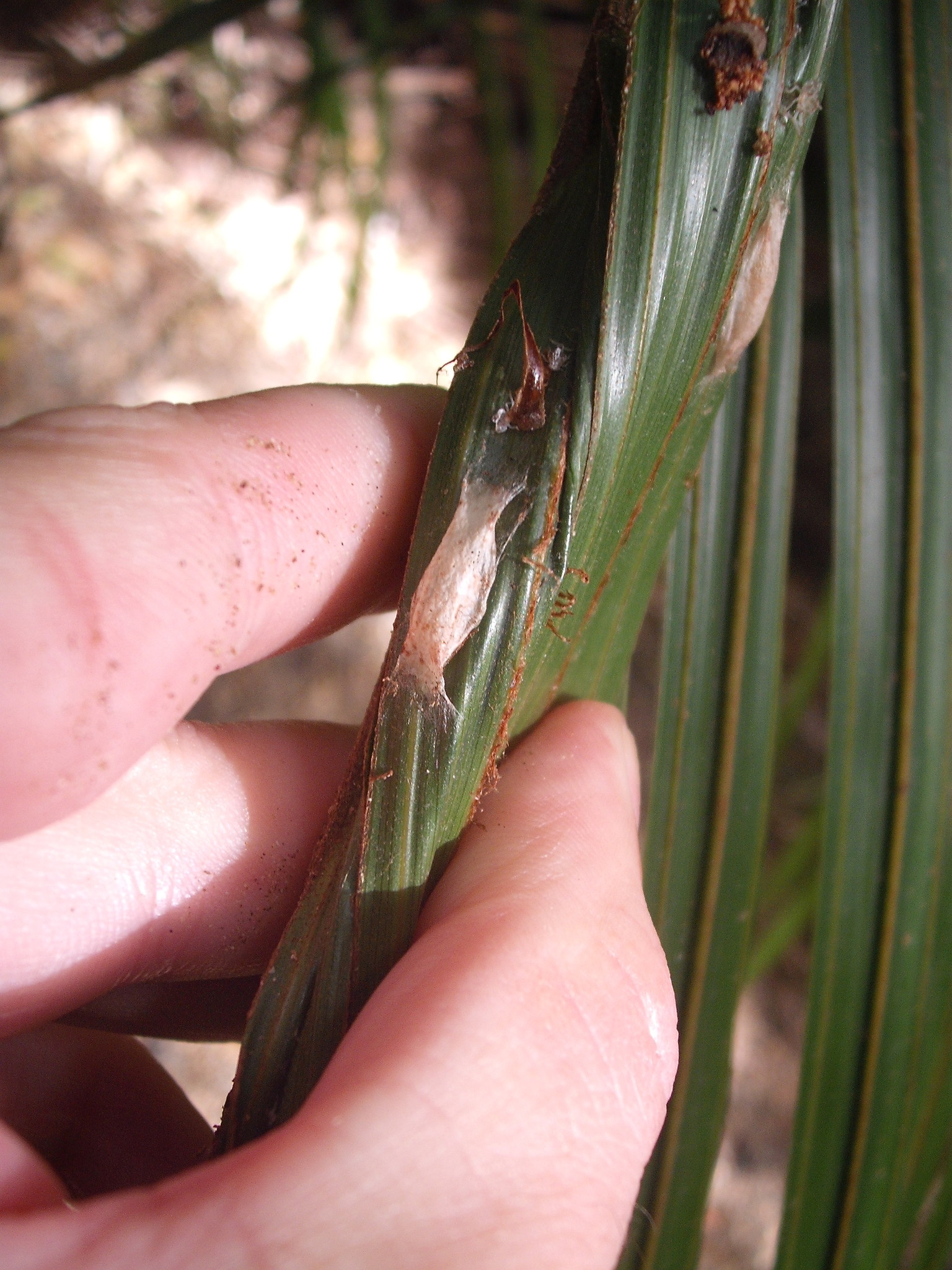
Cocoon

The wingspan of this species is between 8.5 and 11 mm. The cocoons of this species are oval shaped with flat spread out edges.

== Distribution ==
This species is endemic to New Zealand and can be found throughout the North Island and in the north-west of Nelson.

== Habitat and hosts ==
This species inhabits native forest particularly forest on the coast. The larvae of this species feed on the berries of Nikau palm trees. They spin the berries together with silk threads and when fully mature the larvae travel down to the trunk of the palm to pupate there in white-brown cocoons.

== Behaviour ==
Adults are on the wing all through the year. They have been observed resting, in a head down position, on Nikau palms. Often adults can be observed near the cocoons of their larvae. Although they are nocturnal they are only occasionally attracted to light.
