= Drood (disambiguation) =

Edwin Drood may refer to:

- The Mystery of Edwin Drood (disambiguation), adaptations of an unfinished Charles Dickens novel, and its title character
- Protagonist of Secret History (book series), a fantasy/science fiction series by Simon R. Green.

Drood may refer to:

- Drood (musical), original name for The Mystery of Edwin Drood
- Drood (novel), 2009 fictionalized account by Dan Simmons of the last five years of Charles Dickens' life
- The Drood Review of Mystery, periodical

Other fictional characters named Drood

- C. C. Drood, protagonist of Slam Dance (film), played by Tom Hulce
- Davy Drood, in Parents' Day (novel)
- Judy Drood, protagonist of Mad Night by Richard Sala
- Molan Drood, played by Jean-Yves Berteloot in Métal Hurlant Chronicles
- Peggy Drood, in the film A Babysitter's Guide to Monster Hunting
- Ram Drood, in World's Finest Team in DC Comics

== See also ==
- Drude (disambiguation)
