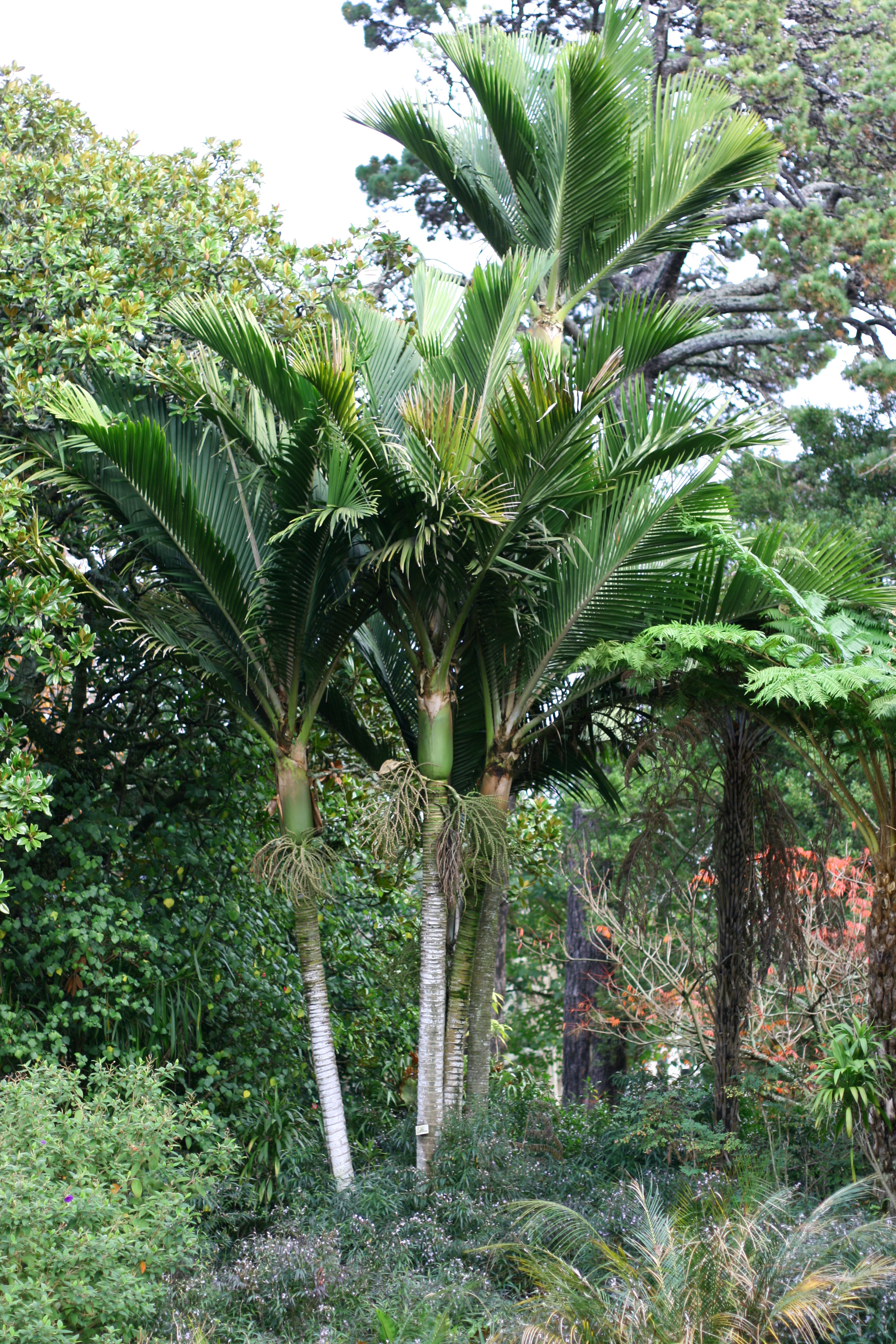

Scientific classification
- Kingdom: Plantae
- Clade: Tracheophytes
- Clade: Angiosperms
- Clade: Monocots
- Clade: Commelinids
- Order: Arecales
- Family: Arecaceae
- Genus: Rhopalostylis
- Species: R. baueri

Binomial name
- Rhopalostylis baueri (Hook.f.) H.Wendl. & Drude

Synonyms
- Rhopalostylis cheesemanii

= Rhopalostylis baueri =

Species of palm

Rhopalostylis baueri is a species of palm native to Norfolk Island (Australia) and to the Kermadec Islands (New Zealand). Norfolk Island is the type locality. The common names on Norfolk Island are 'Norfolk Island palm' or 'niau'. In New Zealand the name 'Kermadec nikau' is used to refer to the Kermadec Islands population.

== Distribution ==
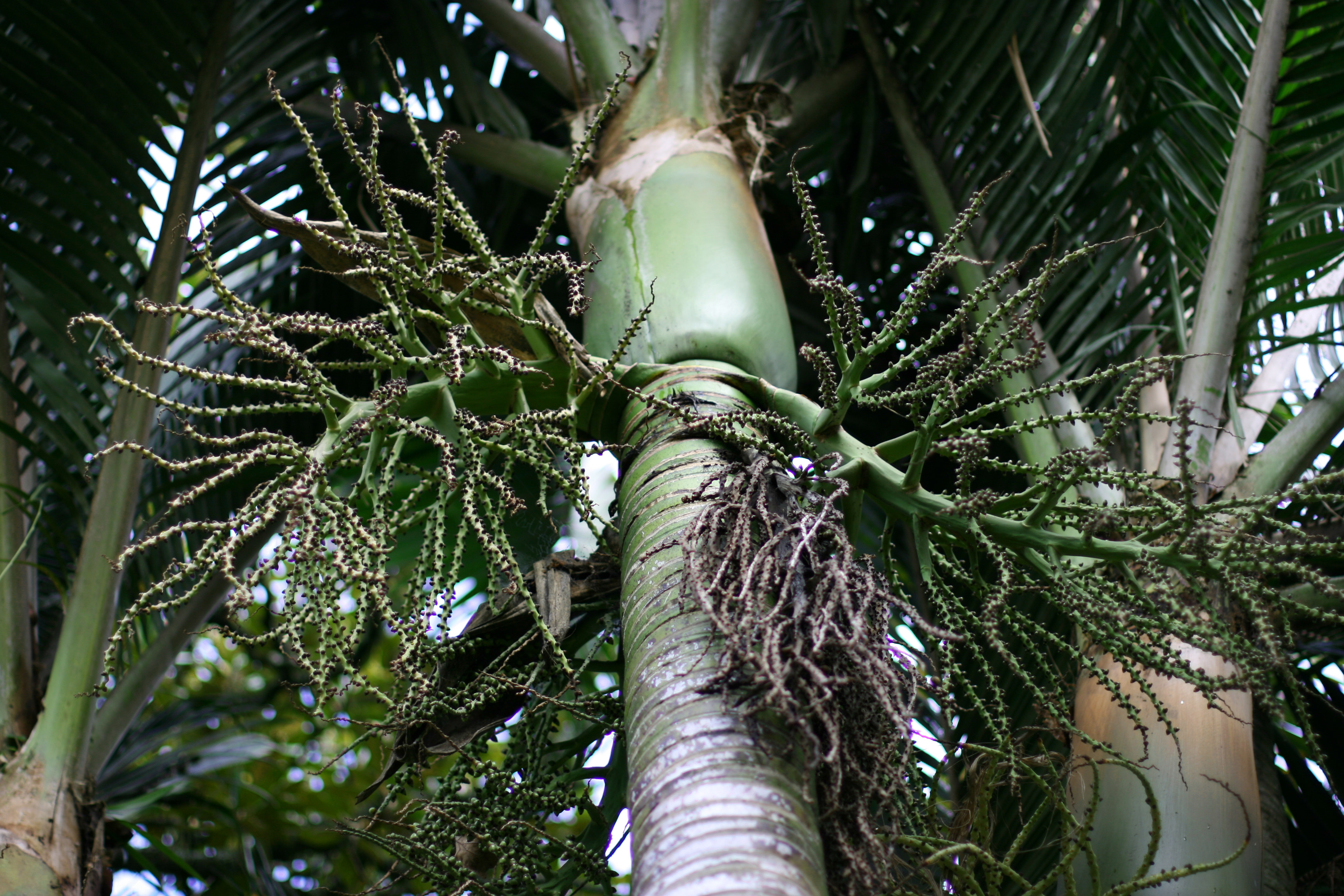
R. baueri has a prominent crownshaft

On Norfolk Island it now occupies a small range in the centre of the island near the national park, where the species is somewhat threatened by rats that eat the fruit and young seedlings. It is rare elsewhere on the island. In the Kermadec Islands part of its range it is not threatened, but it only occurs on Raoul Island. Following the successful eradication of rats on Raoul Island, the palm has greatly extended its range. On Norfolk Island, which is still infested with rodents, R. baueri is regenerating and is abundant in some localities. If rodents were eliminated from Norfolk, the palm would benefit greatly.

== Description and uses ==
Rhopalostylis baueri reaches 10 m or more in height. The pinnate leaves are 3 to 4 m long, on a stout, erect petiole (leafstem) approximately 20 cm long. The crownshaft is 50–60 cm long. The inflorescence is 30 50 cm long and has from 50 to 60 fairly stout branches. The fruits are green at first, turning a bright red when ripe, and are a favorite food of the endangered Norfolk Island parakeet. The growing tip of the palm was used by early settlers as a vegetable and is said to have tasted like a nut when raw and like an artichoke bottom when boiled.

== Cultivation ==
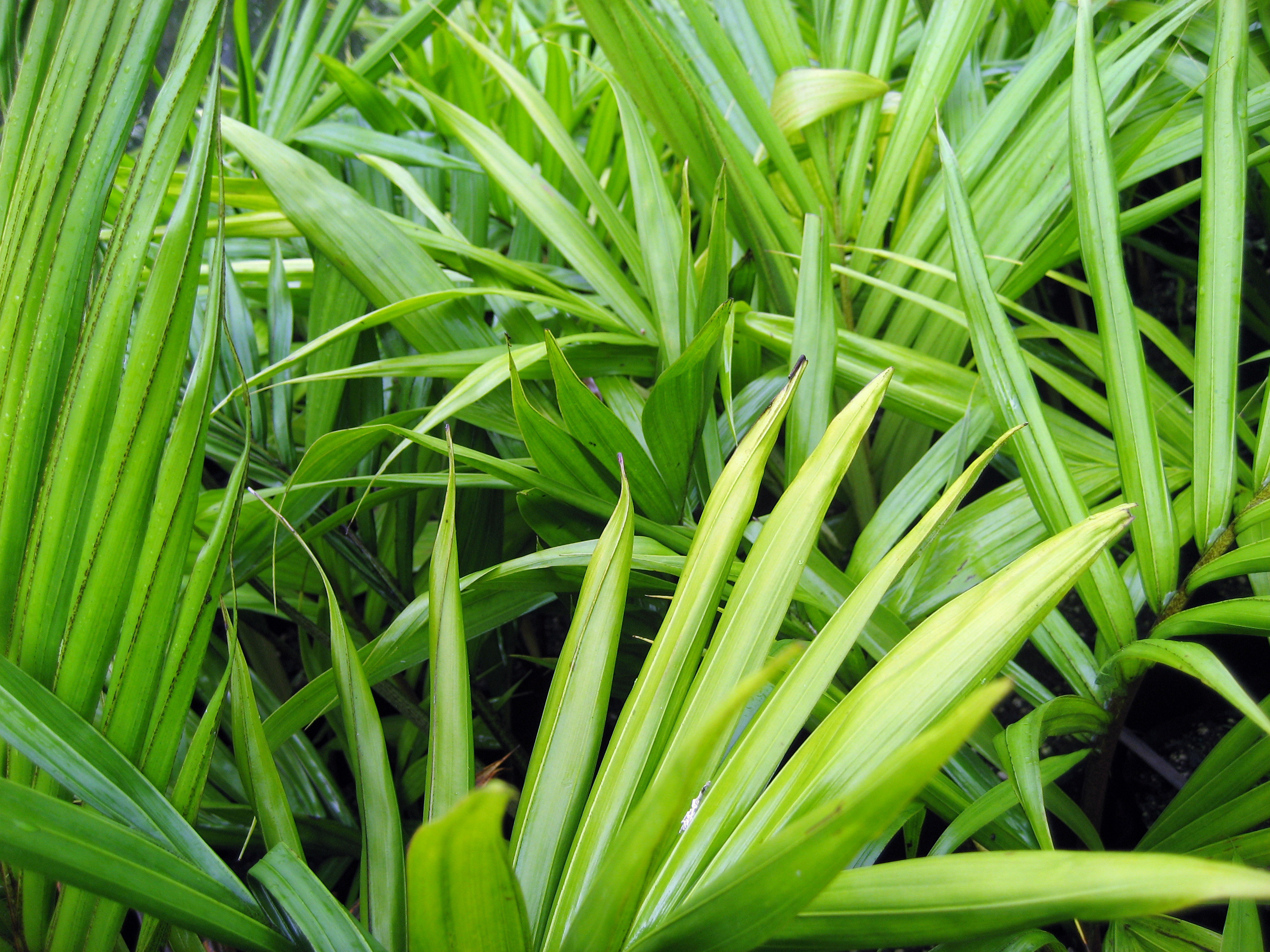
Seedlings of R. baueri grown for sale in New Zealand

In the Southern Hemisphere outside its habitats, R. baueri is cultivated in mainland New Zealand as a faster-growing alternative to the otherwise similar R. sapida, the nīkau palm, the only other species in the genus Rhopalostylis. It is also grown in the Australian states of New South Wales, Queensland, Victoria, and Western Australia. In the Northern Hemisphere excellent cultivated specimens are found on the coasts of the southeastern Azores and Madeira, which offer similar climates to those of the species' origin. The species is also grown outdoors in coastal California, Hawai'i, continental Portugal and Spain, the Canary Islands, and in parts of the Mediterranean basin (e.g., Palermo, Italy).
