= Drude (surname) =

Drude is a surname. Notable people with the surname include:

- Antoine Drude (1853–1943), French general
- Carl Georg Oscar Drude (1852–1933), German botanist
- Paul Drude (1863–1906), German physicist

== See also ==
- Draude
- Drude, type of witch
- Drood
- Drue
