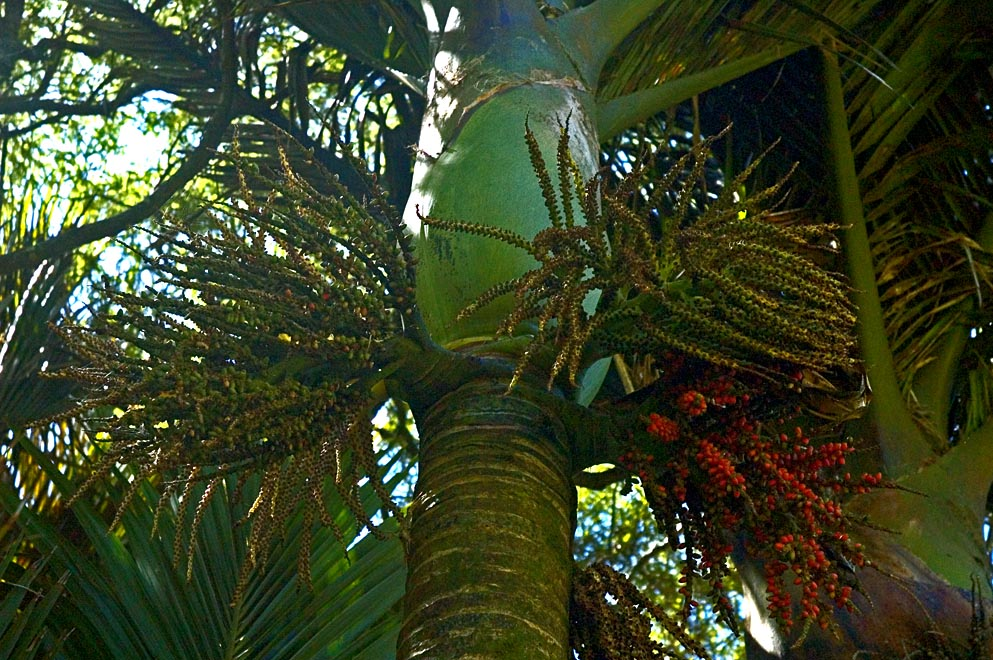
- Flowers and fruit of Rhopalostylis sapida

Scientific classification
- Kingdom: Plantae
- Clade: Tracheophytes
- Clade: Angiosperms
- Clade: Monocots
- Clade: Commelinids
- Order: Arecales
- Family: Arecaceae
- Subfamily: Arecoideae
- Tribe: Areceae
- Subtribe: Rhopalostylidinae
- Genus: Rhopalostylis; H.Wendl. & Drude

Species
- Rhopalostylis baueri; Rhopalostylis sapida

= Rhopalostylis =

Genus of palms

Rhopalostylis is a genus of two species of palms native to the South Pacific. Both are smooth-trunked, with regular ringed scars from fallen leaves. The leaves are 3–5 m in length, and the leaf bases encircle the trunk.

== Distribution ==
Rhopalostylis baueri occurs on Norfolk Island and the Kermadec Islands northeast of New Zealand; the Kermadec Islands population, formerly separated as R. cheesemanii, was included in R. baueri in 2005 after comparison revealed no significant differences. R. sapida, known as the nikau palm, is the only palm native to mainland New Zealand, and is found in lowland forests in the North Island, in coastal areas of the South Island as far south as Banks Peninsula, and on the Chatham Islands at 44°S. R. sapida thus has the southernmost range of any palm genus.

== Classification ==
Subfamily: Arecoideae; tribe: Areceae; subtribe: Rhopalostylidinae. Rhopalostylis is closely related to the Lord Howe Island genus Hedyscepe.

=== Species ===
| Image | Trunk | Scientific name | Common name | Distribution |
|---|---|---|---|---|
| | | Rhopalostylis baueri | Norfolk Island palm, niau, Kermadec nikau | Norfolk Island (Australia) and Kermadec Islands (New Zealand) |
| | | Rhopalostylis sapida | Nīkau | New Zealand the North Island, and on the South Island as far south as Okarito, west and Banks Peninsula in the east. Chatham Island and Pitt Island/Rangiauria |
