= Draude =

Draude is a surname. Notable people with the surname include:

- June Draude (born 1949), Canadian politician
- Kristian Draude (born 1977), German musician
- Thomas V. Draude (born 1940), retired officer of the United States Marine Corps

== See also ==
- Drude (surname)
