= Pseudocercospora arecacearum =

Scientific classification
- Kingdom: Fungi
- Division: Ascomycota
- Class: Dothideomycetes
- Order: Capnodiales
- Family: Mycosphaerellaceae
- Genus: Pseudocercospora
- Species: P. arecacearum

Binomial name
- Pseudocercospora arecacearum Braun, Hill & Schubert

Species of fungus

Pseudocercospora arecacearum is a species of fungus. It was originally found on the fronds of Rhopalostylis sapida (nīkau palm tree) in northern New Zealand, and it was published in 2006, along with other Pseudocercospora species; Pseudocercospora gunnerae and Pseudocercospora pandoreae.
