= The Mystery of Edwin Drood (disambiguation) =

The Mystery of Edwin Drood is an unfinished novel by Charles Dickens.

The Mystery of Edwin Drood may refer to various adaptations of the book:

- The Mystery of Edwin Drood (1909 film), a feature film based on the fiction work
- The Mystery of Edwin Drood (1914 film), directed by Herbert Blaché
- The Mystery of Edwin Drood (1935 film), an American melodrama directed by Stuart Walker
- The Mystery of Edwin Drood (1993 film), a British film
- The Mystery of Edwin Drood (miniseries), a 2012 British television adaptation
- The Mystery of Edwin Drood (musical), first staged in 1985
