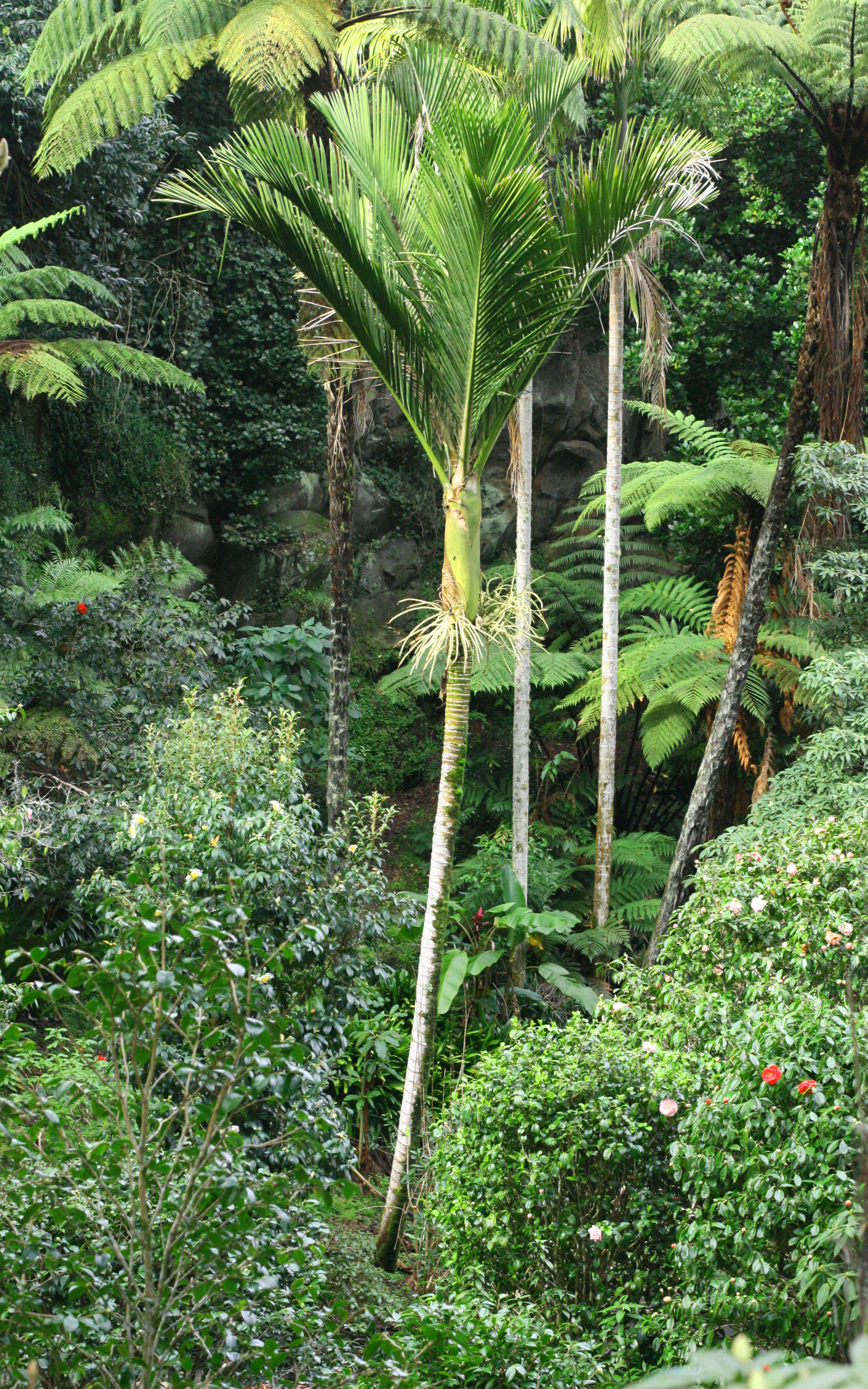

Conservation status
- Least Concern (IUCN 3.1)

Scientific classification
- Kingdom: Plantae
- Clade: Tracheophytes
- Clade: Angiosperms
- Clade: Monocots
- Clade: Commelinids
- Order: Arecales
- Family: Arecaceae
- Genus: Rhopalostylis
- Species: R. sapida

Binomial name
- Rhopalostylis sapida H.Wendl. & Drude

= Rhopalostylis sapida =

Species of palm native to New Zealand

Rhopalostylis sapida, commonly known as nīkau, is a palm tree endemic to New Zealand, and the only palm native to mainland New Zealand.

== Description ==
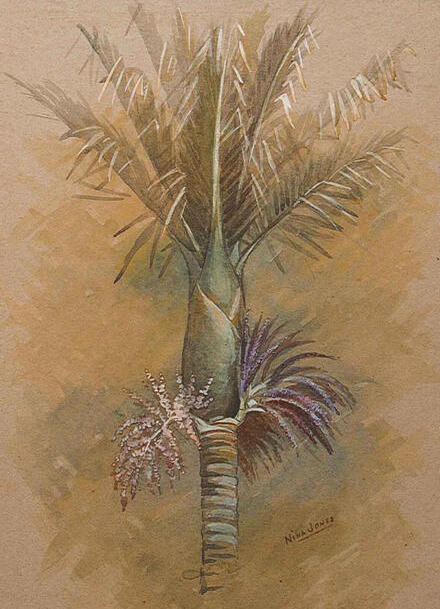
Botanical illustration by Nina Jones, c. 1920

Nīkau grow up to 15 m (49 ft) tall, with a stout, green trunk which bears grey-green leaf scars. The trunk is topped by a smooth, bulging crownshaft up to 1 m (3 ft 3 in) long. The fronds are up to 3 m (9.8 ft) long, and the closely set, sometimes overlapping leaflets are up to 1 m (3 ft 3 in) long. The inflorescence is multibranched and from 20–40 cm (7.9–15.7 in) long. The tightly packed flowers are unisexual and coloured lilac to pink. Male flowers are borne in pairs, and have six stamens. The female flowers are solitary. The fruit is elliptic or oblong, and generally measures about 10 by 7 mm, and is red when ripe. Nīkau produce flowers between November and April, and fruit ripens from February to November, taking almost a year to fully ripen.

=== Variation ===
The nīkau palm shows considerable variation in the wild. Plants from the South Island and the offshore islands of the North Island have larger, more-gracefully-arching fronds and are popular in cultivation. The Chatham Islands form is particularly different, having a distinct juvenile form and larger fruits, and a thicker covering of fine hairs on the fronds. More research is needed into its precise relationship with the mainland form. The nīkau palm of the New Zealand mainland is very similar to Rhopalostylis baueri of the Kermadecs and Norfolk Island, which can be distinguished by its more rounded or oval fruits, and by its leaflets which are broader than those found in most populations of R. sapida.

== Taxonomy ==
The species was described using the name Areca sapida in 1786 by Georg Forster based on material and descriptions collected by Daniel Solander. In 1878, the taxon was moved to the species' current scientific name, Rhopalostylis sapida, by Hermann Wendland and Carl Georg Oscar Drude.

== Etymology ==
Nīkau is a word borrowed and adapted from the Māori language; cognates of this word in the closely related Eastern Polynesian languages of the tropical Pacific refer to the fronds or the midrib of the coconut palm (niu). A common folk etymology for nīkau is that the word means "no coconuts", but there is no evidence. The species epithet sapida means "savoury", and is a reference to the edible nature of the plant.

The English language name "cabbage palm" was first used in the journals of James Cook and Joseph Banks, used to refer to the edible palm heart of Rhopalostylis sapida.

== Ecology ==
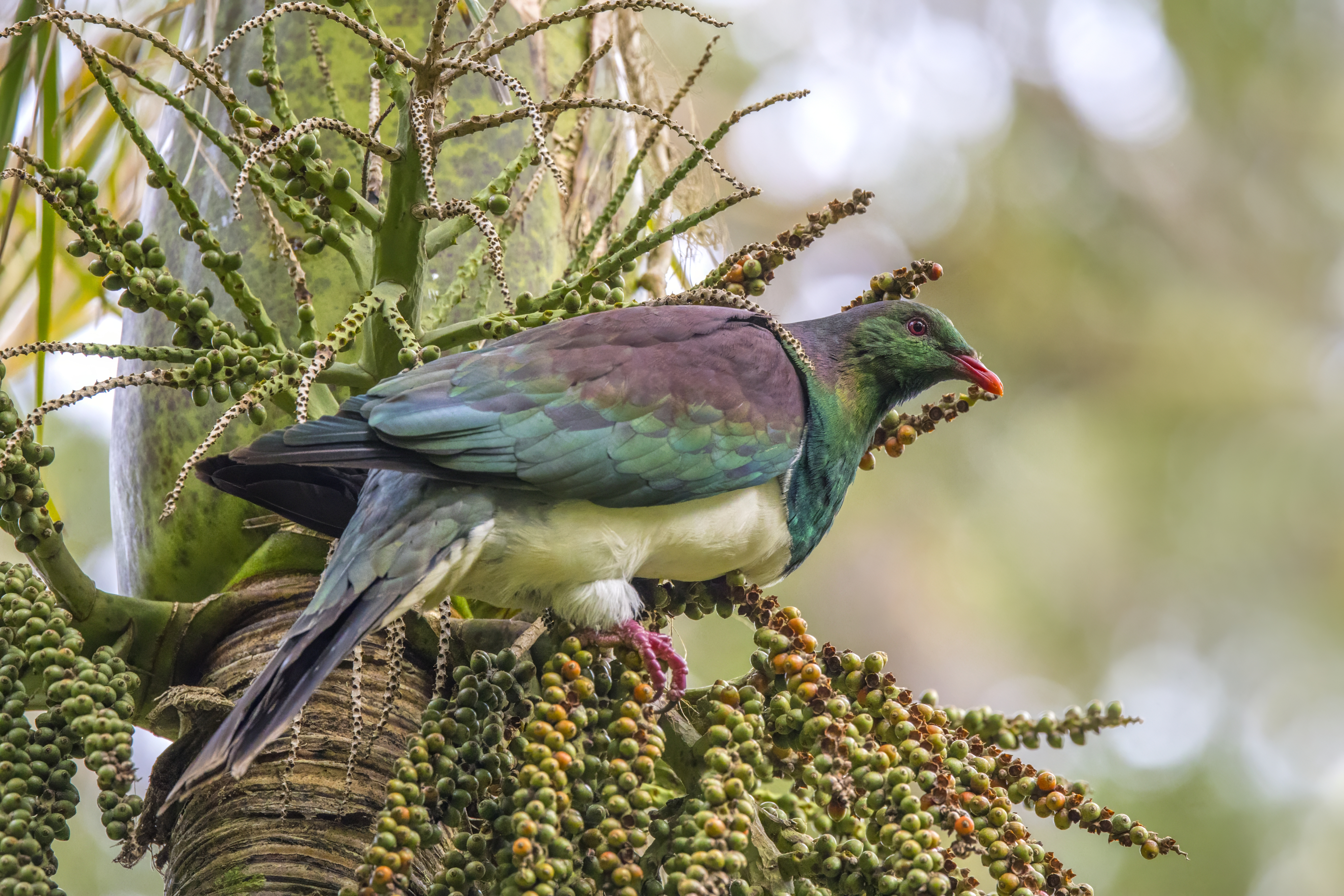
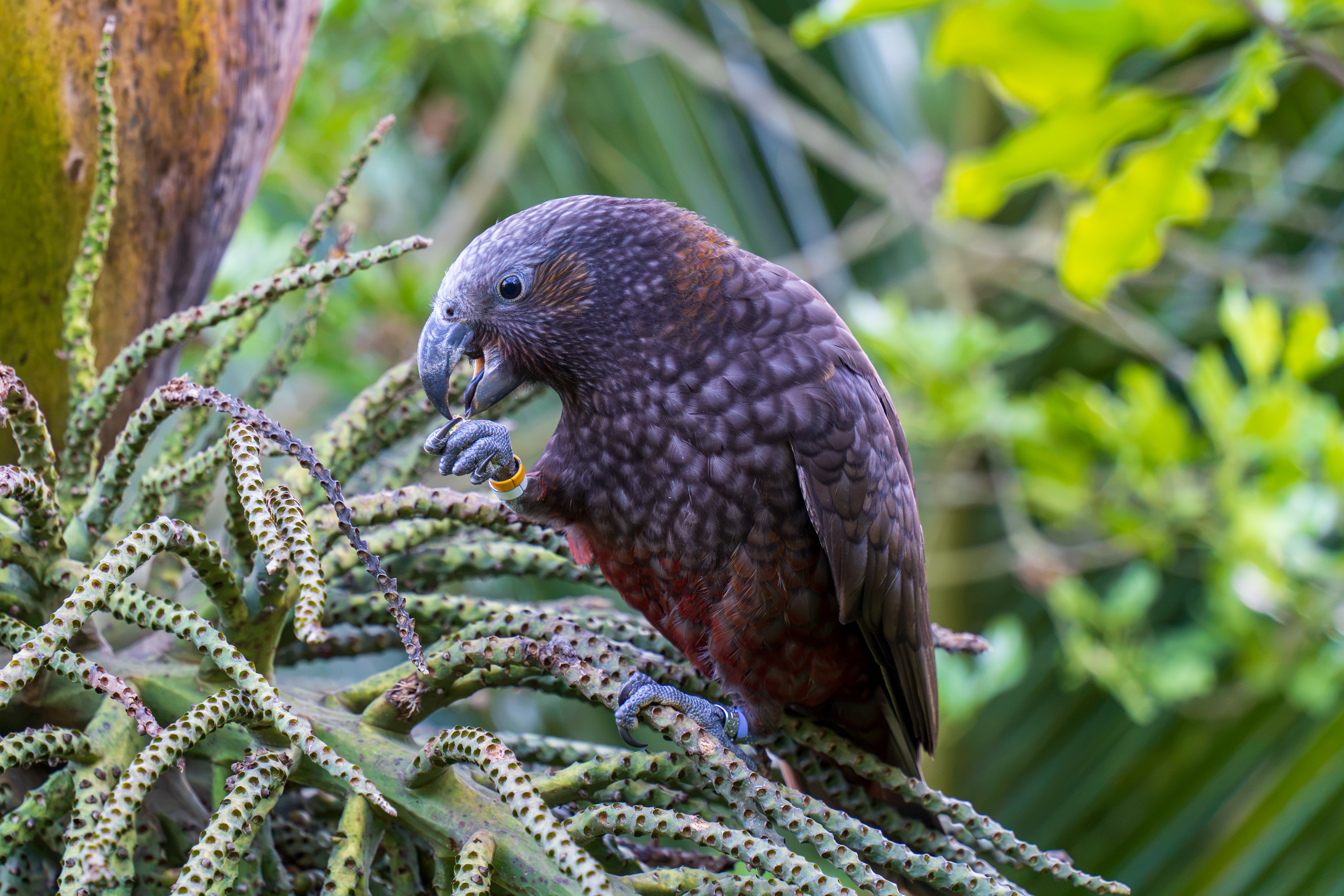
Nīkau palm kernels are an important food source for kererū (top) and kākā (bottom).

While tropical plants were more commonly found in New Zealand in past epochs, Rhopalostylis sapida is the sole member of Arecaceae to survive the ice ages in mainland New Zealand.

Nīkau palm kernels are an important food source for kererū and kākā.

Among the insects associated with this palm is the little-known pleasing fungus beetle Hapalips prolixus, adults and larvae of which have been found at the base of old nīkau fronds. Whether they feed on the palm or (like most members of their family) on molds or fungi is not clear; the adults have also been found in tree ferns.

Fungus pathogen Pseudocercospora arecacearum can be found on the fronds of the palm.

== Distribution and habitat ==
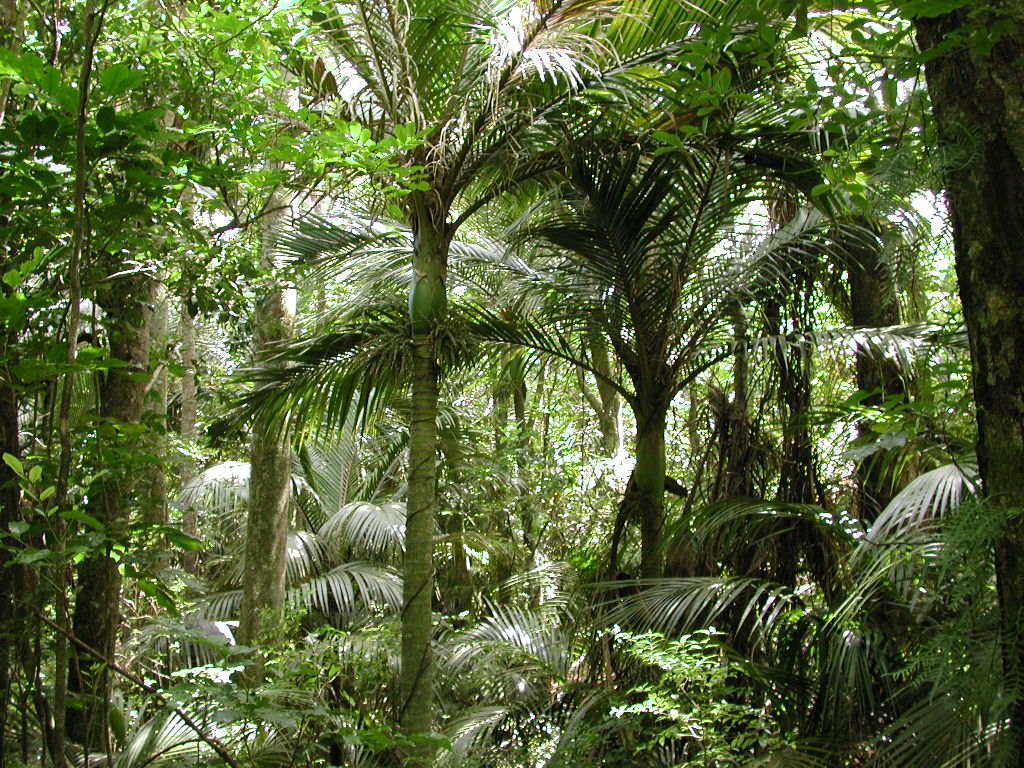
Nīkau grove near Paraparaumu, New Zealand

The nīkau palm is the only palm species endemic to mainland New Zealand. Its natural range is coastal and lowland forest on the North Island, and on the South Island as far south as Ōkārito (43°20′S) in the west and Banks Peninsula (43°5′S) in the east. It also occurs on Chatham Island and Pitt Island/Rangiauria to the south-east of New Zealand, where it is the world's southernmost palm at 44° 18'S latitude.

== Cultivation ==
Nīkau make an excellent potted plant, and are quite hardy. They tend to be slow-growing. They grow readily from seed if the fruit is soaked in water for a few days and then gently scrubbed to remove the flesh. The seed will then germinate readily if placed in sealed plastic bags in partial shade, after which they can be planted in deep pots. The pots should be tall and narrow to provide room for the taproot and to lessen the likelihood of root damage when transplanting.

Transplanting juveniles is generally successful if the main root is left intact. Nīkau do not have a true tap root. Once the main root has been established to a fairly shallow depth of about 400 mm (16 in), roots take on form consistent with other palms. Successful transplanting is possible, but nīkau are very fickle if any trunk is present. It is best done in summer, but a substantial root ball should be preserved, and shade should be provided at the new location – at the very least by tying the outer fronds closer to the centre. Ground watering is recommended because crown watering can induce terminal rot at the very slow-growing new spike. Delays should be avoided in getting nīkau into new ground, and substantial die-back of all but the central spike can be expected.

Nīkau thrive on cool temperatures, but are not commonly subject to freezing weather in their natural habitat. They can survive a few degrees of frost, but are damaged even more severely by sudden large drops in temperature even above freezing. Nīkau grow well in areas with a mild Mediterranean climate.

== Māori cultural uses ==
Māori have many traditional cultural uses for nīkau. The bases of the inner leaves and the young flower clusters are a traditional food, eaten raw or cooked. Food was wrapped in the leaves for cooking, and the old fibrous leaves are used for kete, floor mats, and waterproof thatch for buildings. Nīkau is a versatile material to use in weaving, as the fibres can be used raw without any need for processing.

The heart of the palm, called rito, is a traditional delicacy, only rarely eaten as harvesting will kill the entire tree. Rito has importance in traditional rongoā medicinal practices due to its use as a laxative, seen as especially important for use prior to childbirth. Unripe berries are a traditional food, while ripe berries are inedible, and are used to create traditional necklaces, and during the 19th century, were used as ammunition to shoot birds with muskets, when shot was scarce.

== Early European uses ==
Nīkau palm hearts were an important subsistence food for Bohemian settlers at Puhoi.

== Modern cultural importance ==
Nīkau palm has become a cultural icon of New Zealand, and is a common motif found in artworks and sculptures. These include Nikau (2005), a sculpture by James Wright and Maui'atalanga 'Ofamo'oni at the Auckland Botanic Gardens, and the Nīkau palm columns of the Wellington Central Library by Ian Athfield.

== Gallery ==
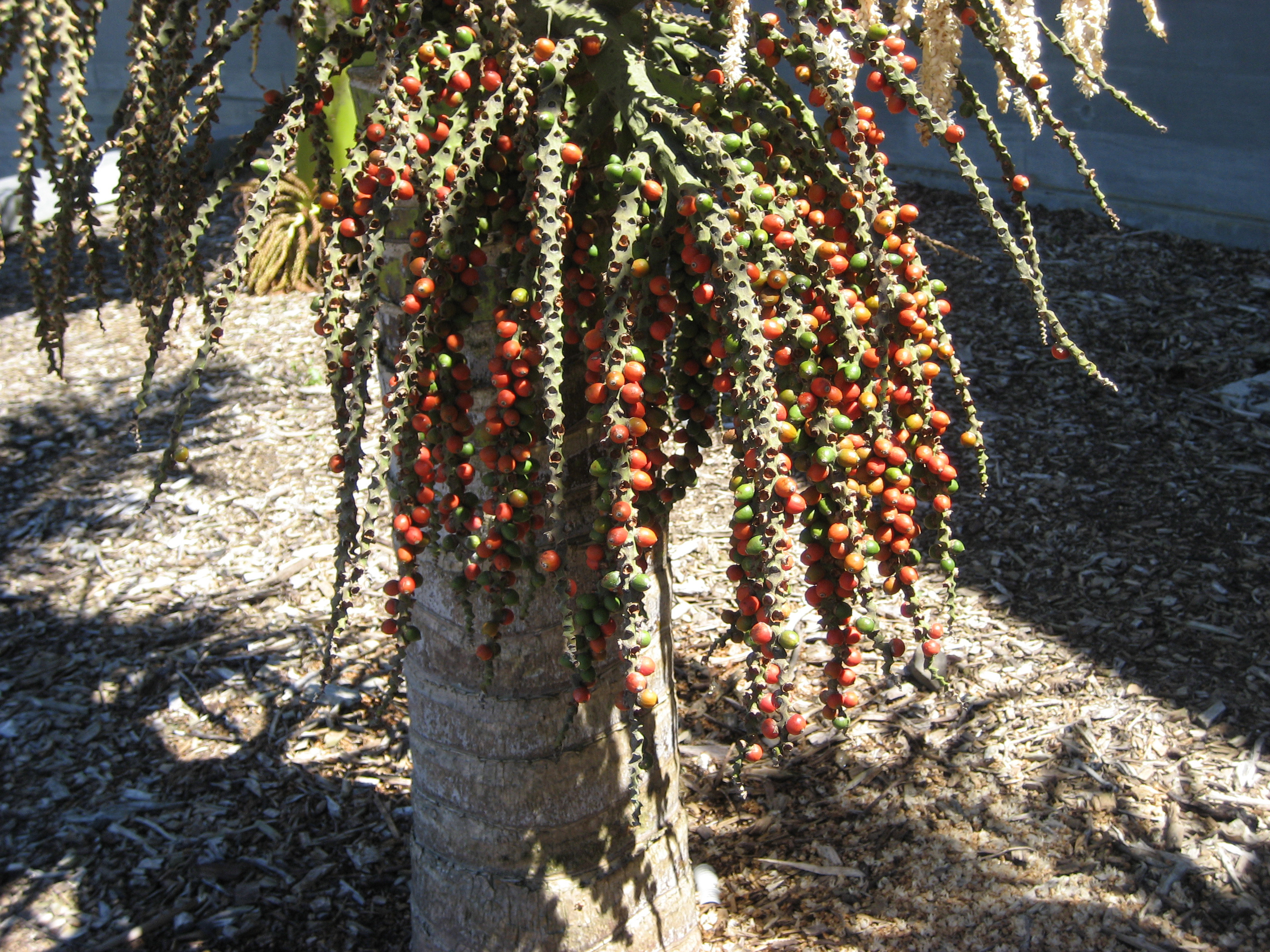
Ripe fruit of the nīkau

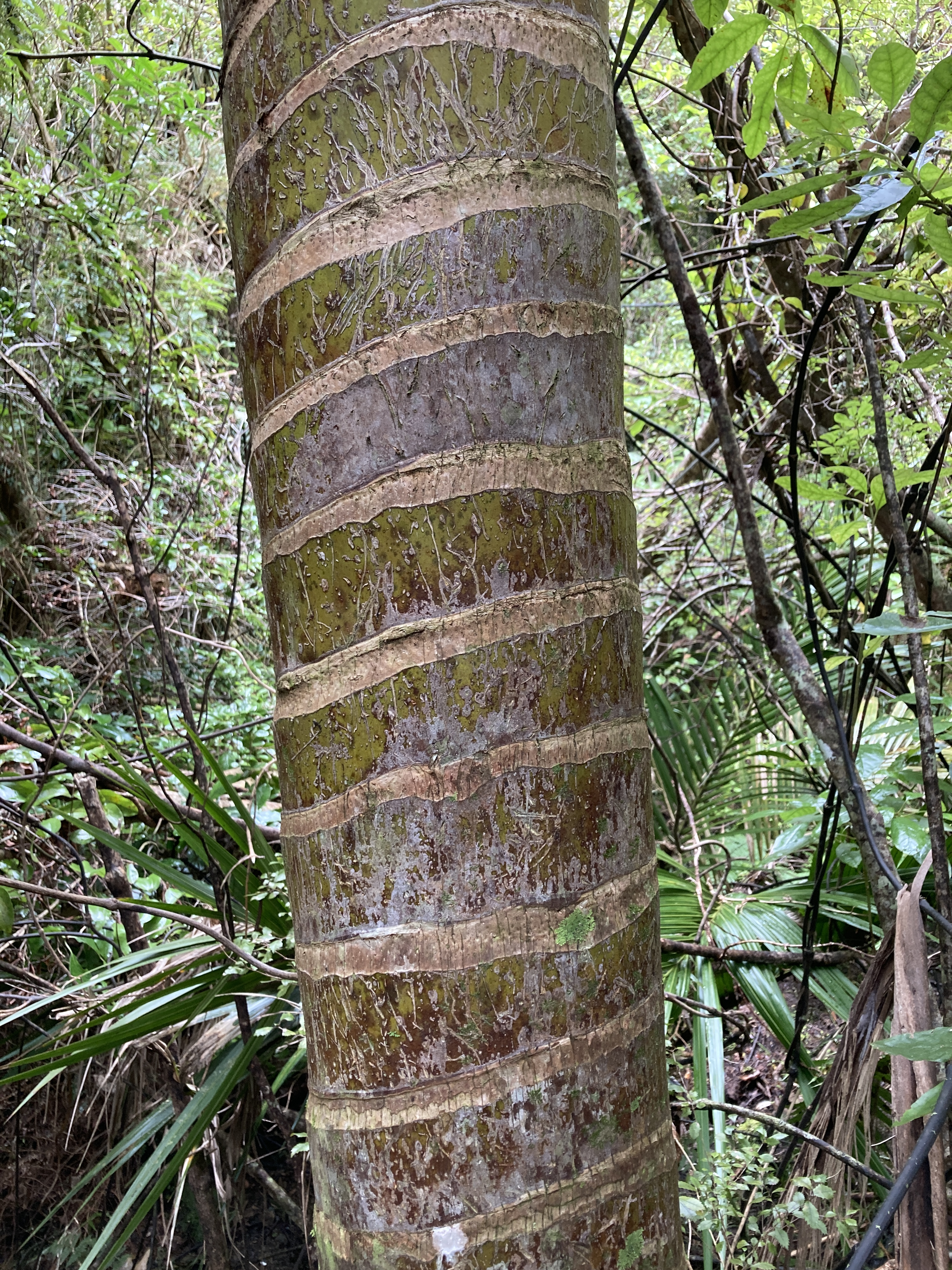
Nīkau palm trunk on Point Elizabeth walkway, Greymouth

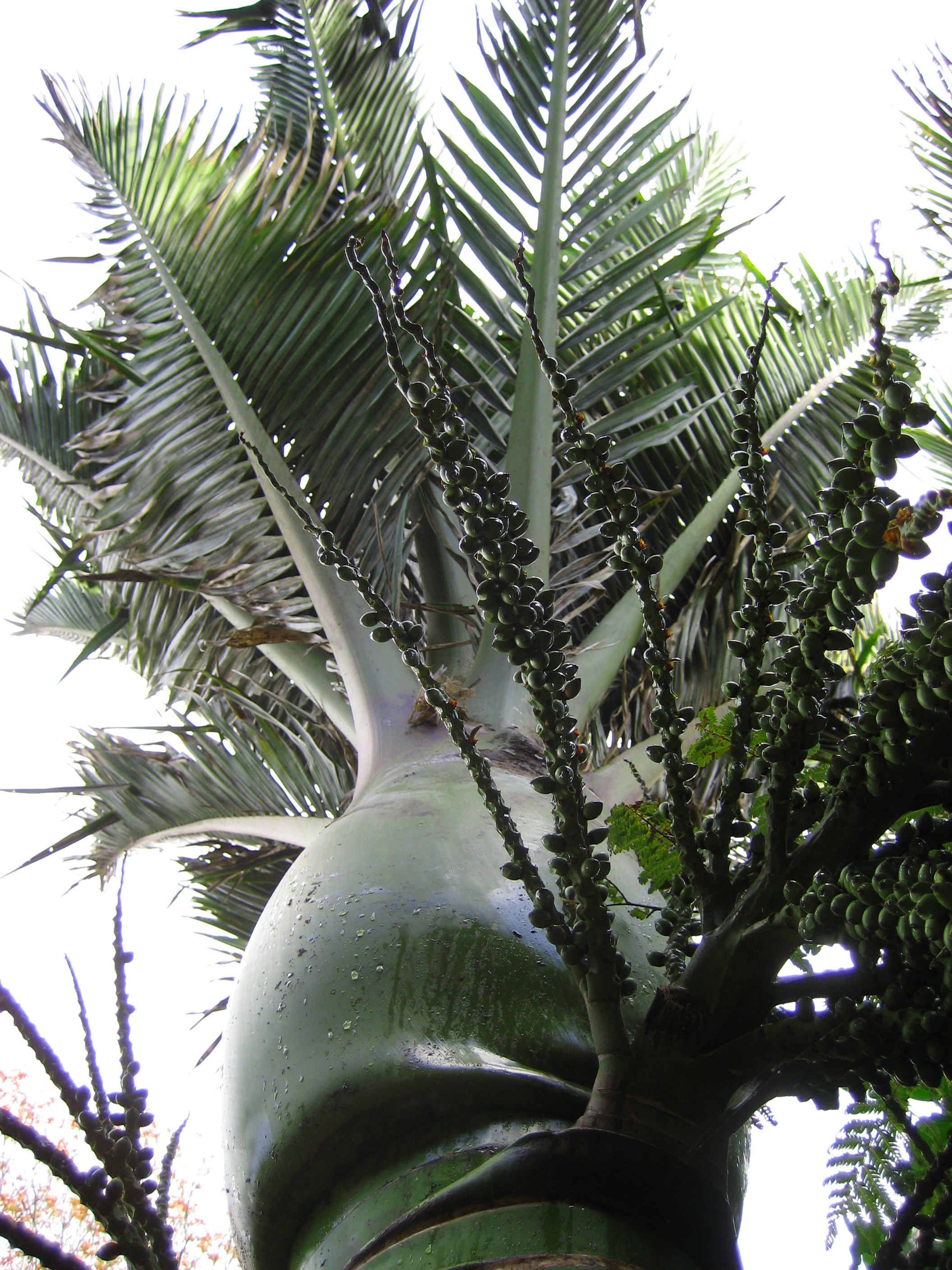
The Chatham Islands nīkau is particularly distinctive

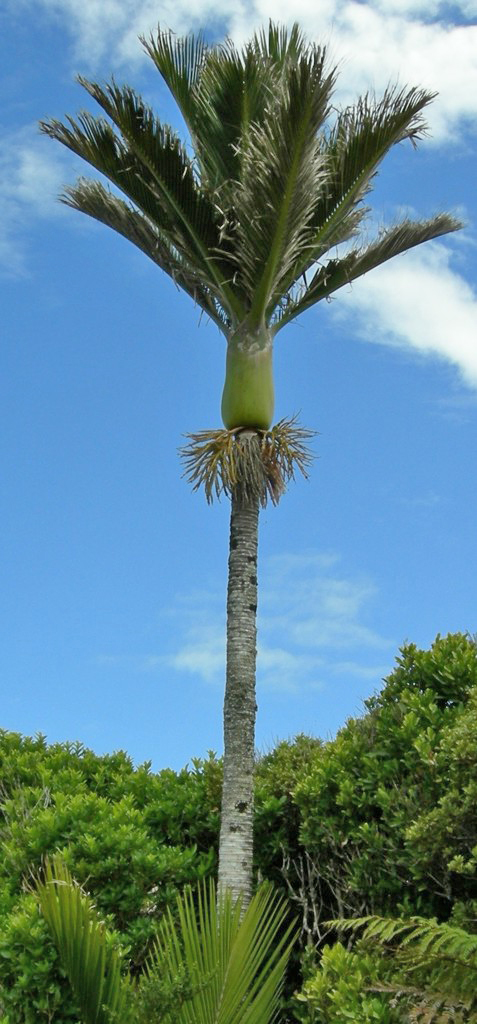
Outstanding nīkau palm

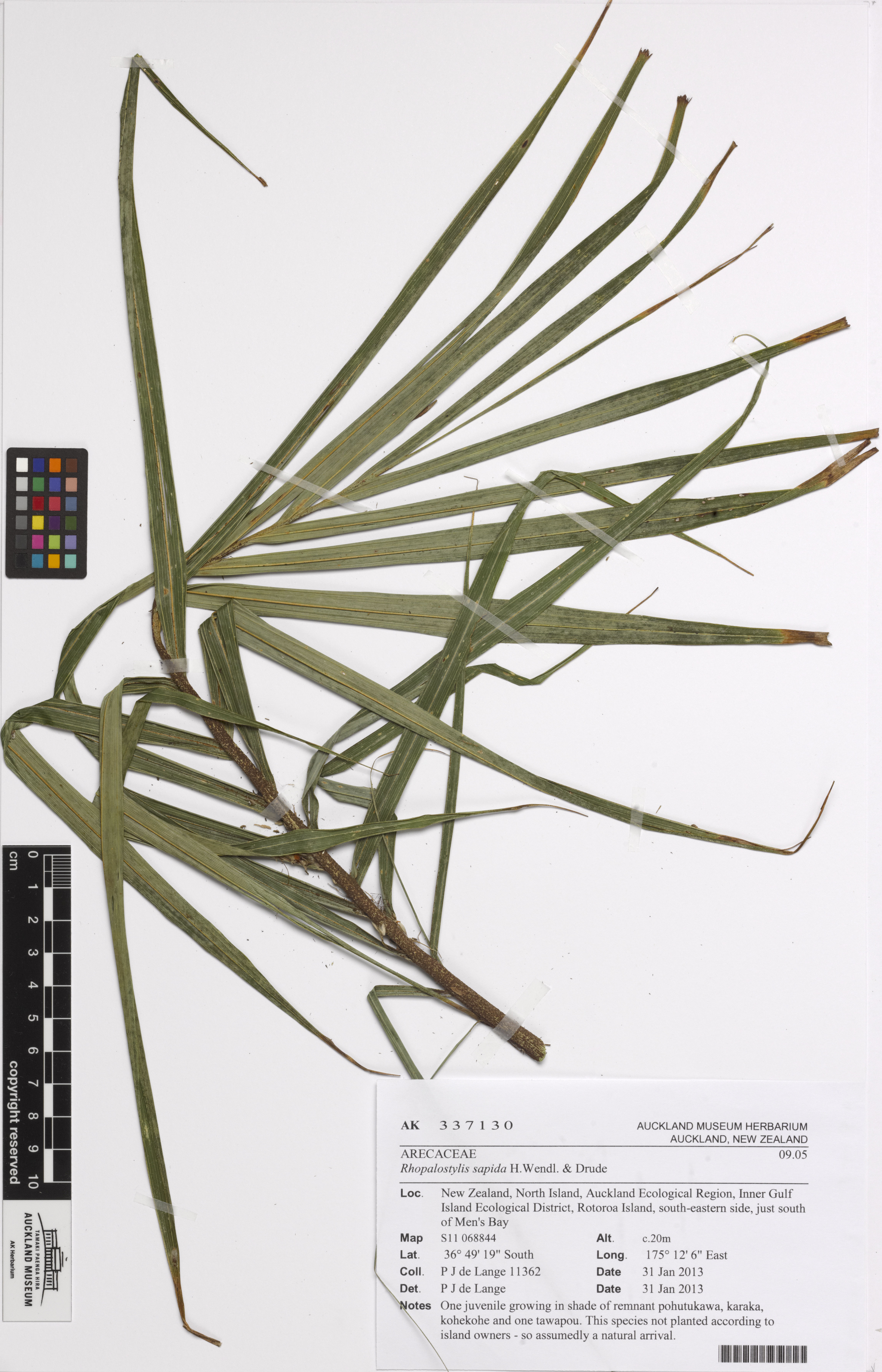
Herbarium specimen

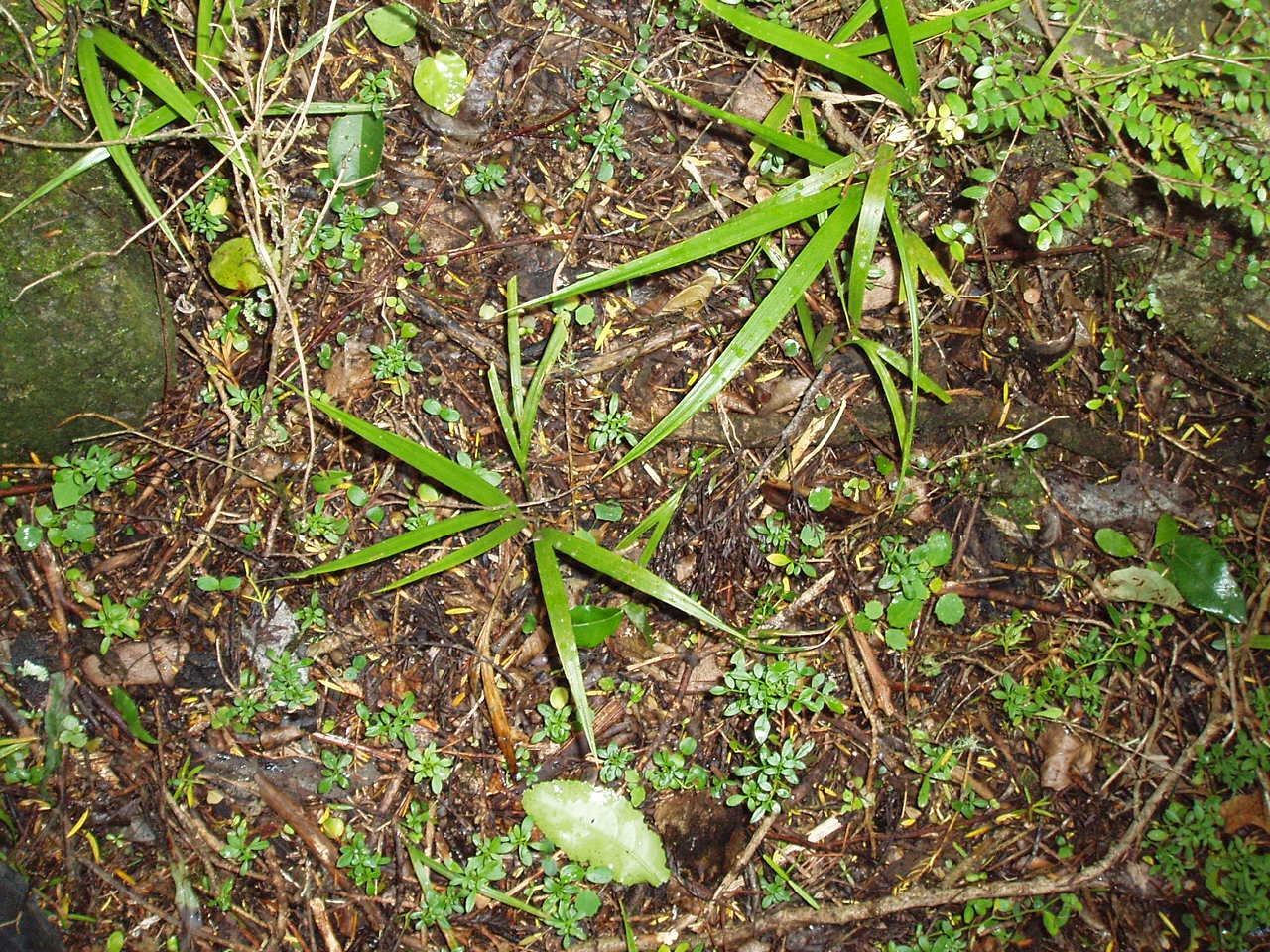
Seedlings

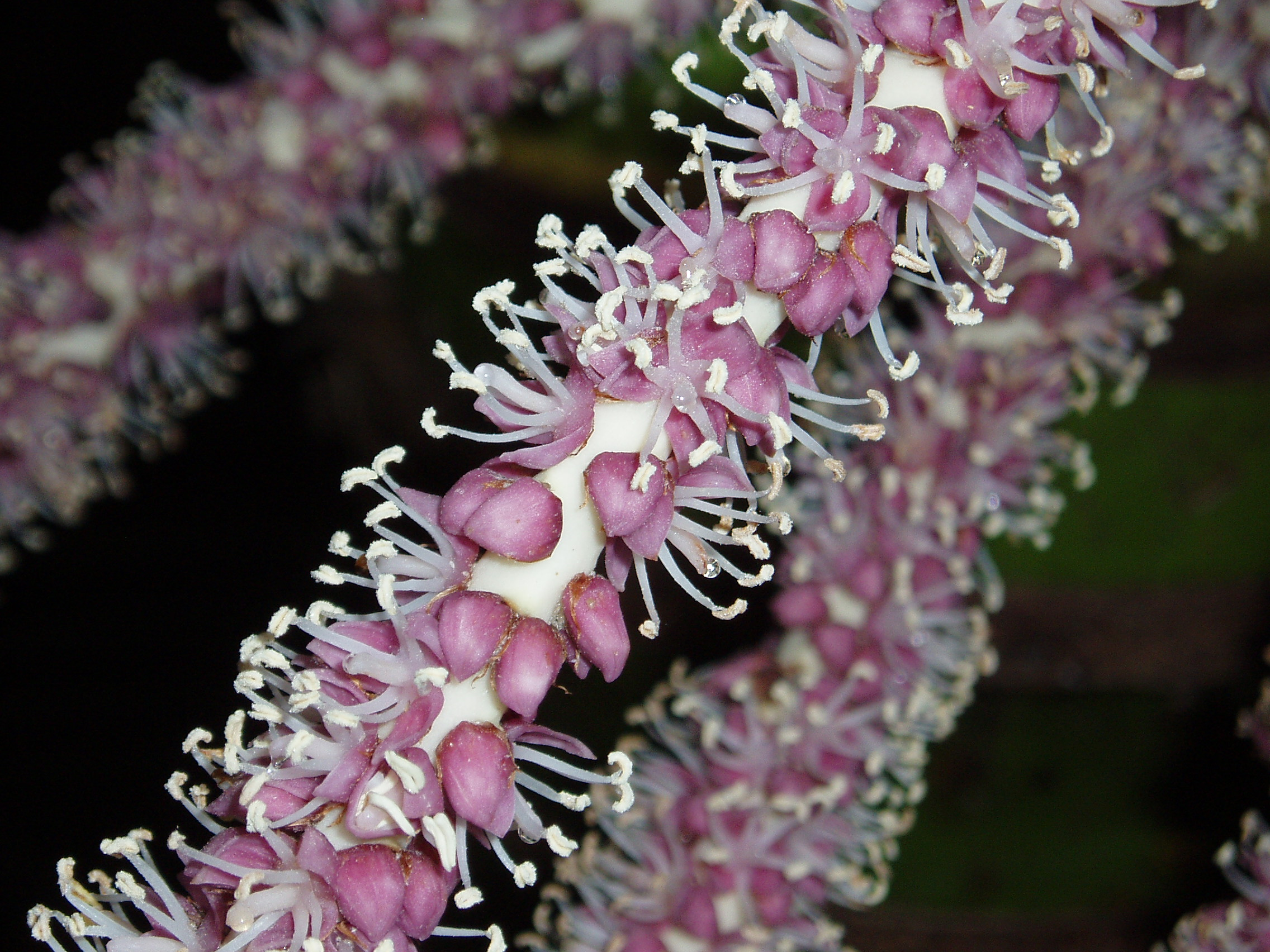
Flowers

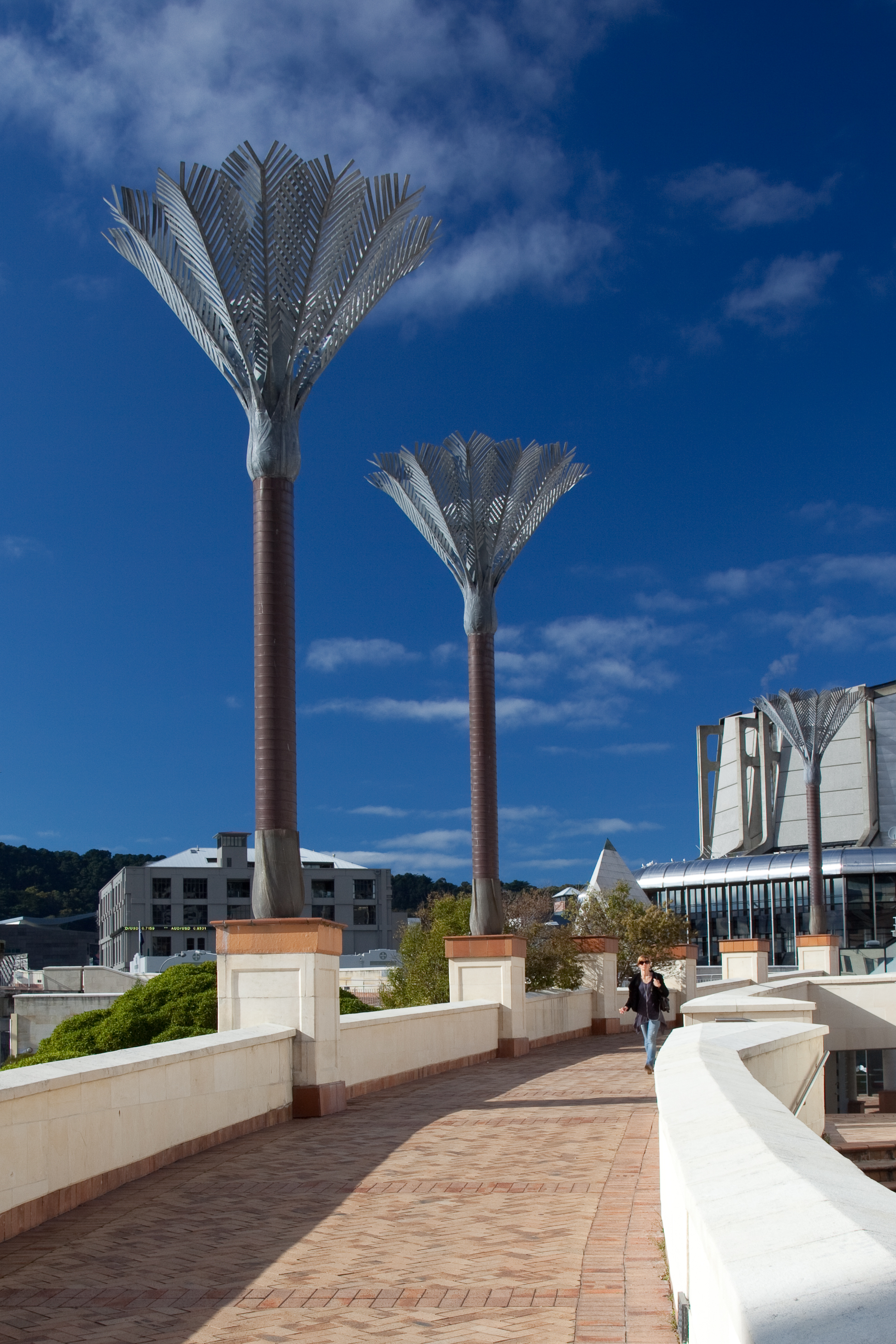
Nīkau palm columns at the Wellington Central Library
