= Carl Georg Oscar Drude =

German botanist (1852–1933)

- Born: 5 June 1852
- Died: 1 February 1933 (aged 80)
- Education: Technical University of Braunschweig
- Scientific career
- Fields: Botany
- Workplaces: University of Göttingen

Carl Georg Oscar Drude (5 June 1852 in Braunschweig – 1 February 1933 in Dresden) was a German botanist.

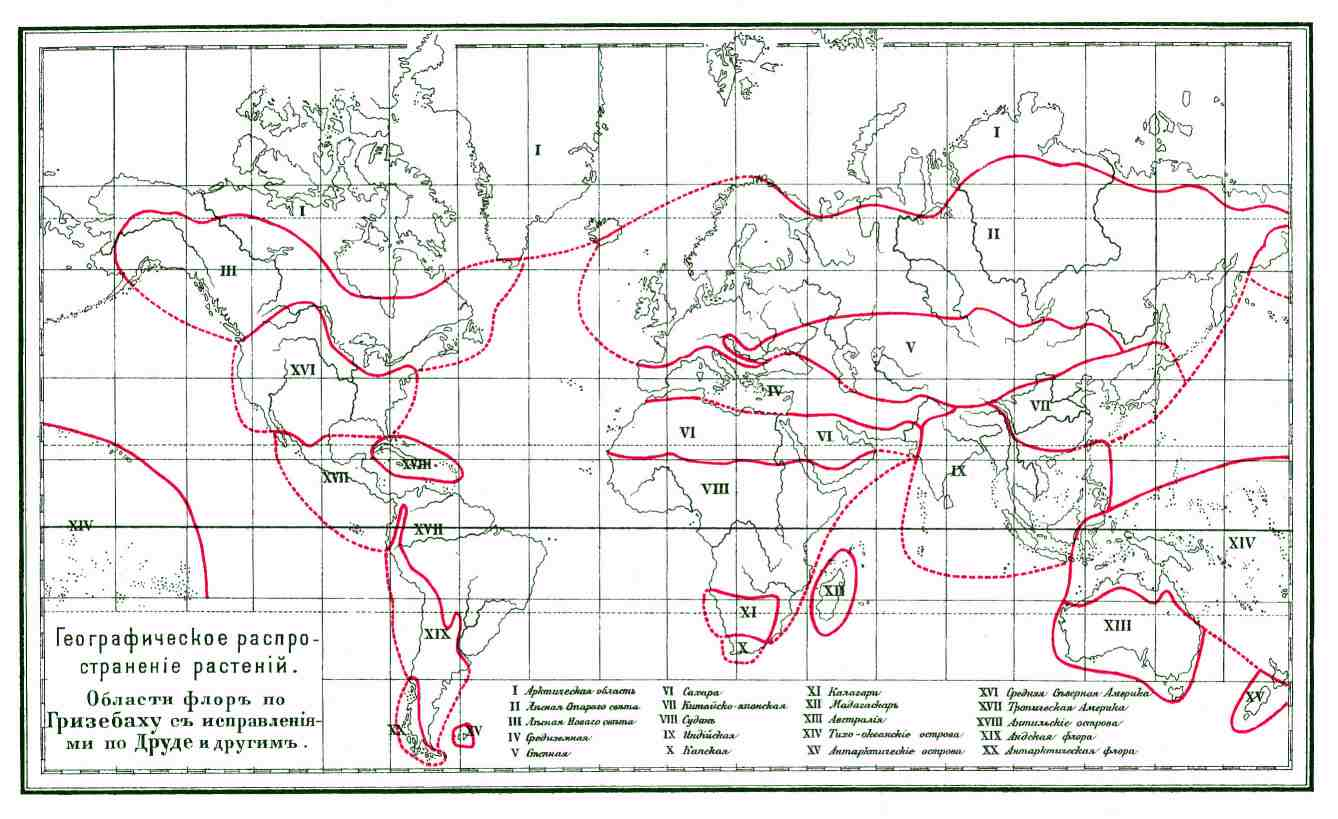
World map depicting biogeographical regions by Grisebach and Drude (mid-1870s).

From 1870 he studied science and chemistry at the Collegium Carolinum in Braunschweig, relocating to the University of Göttingen the following year, where he was influenced by August Grisebach (1814-1879). In 1873 he obtained his PhD and subsequently served as an assistant to Friedrich Gottlieb Bartling (1798-1875).

From 1876 to 1879 he worked as a lecturer in botany at Göttingen, followed by an appointment as chair of botany at Dresden Technical University (1879). Here he served as director of its botanical gardens, which he systematically configured according to a phytogeographical principle. He remained at Dresden until his retirement in 1920, twice serving as university rector (1906-1907, 1918-1919).

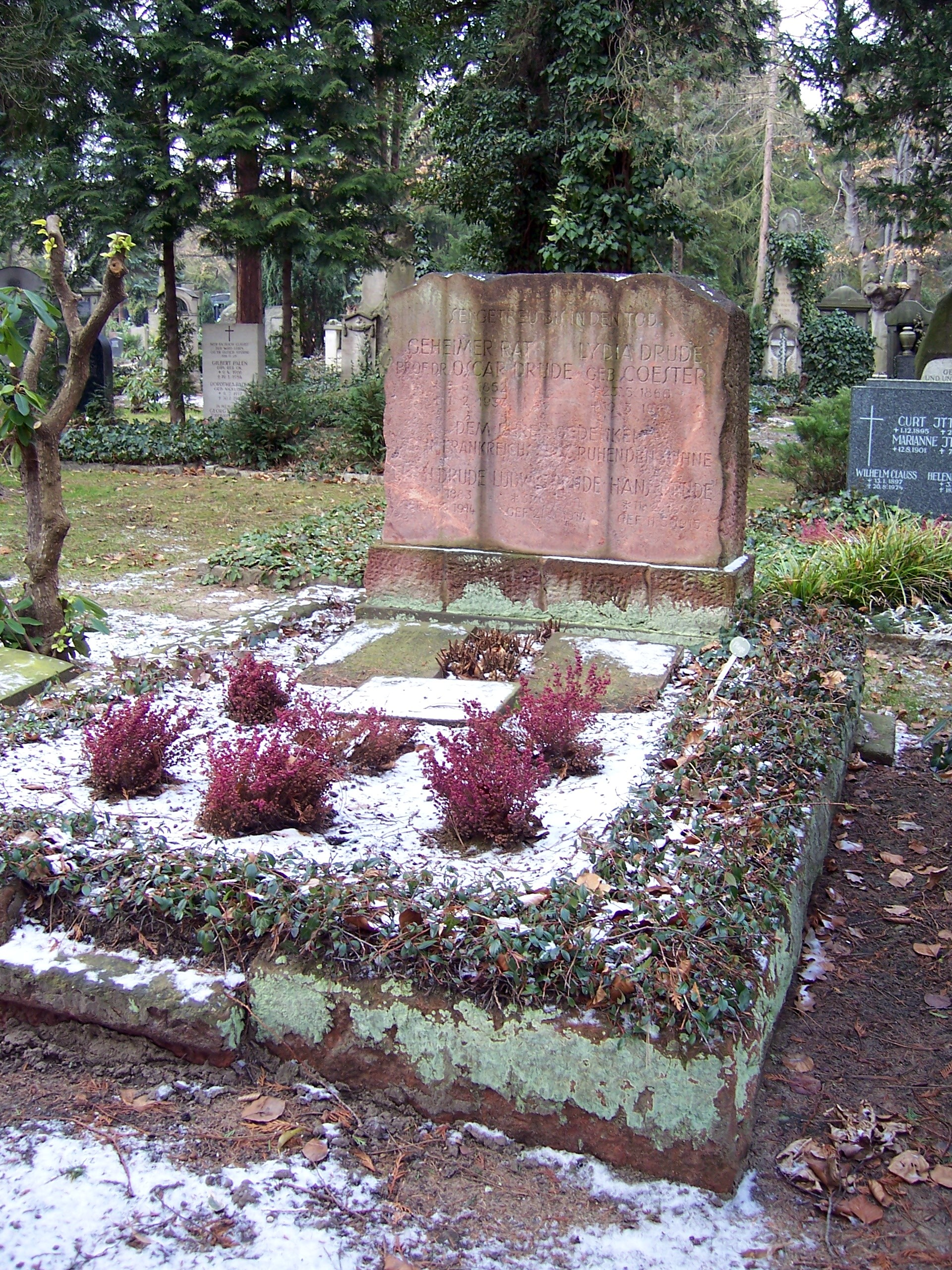
Gravesite of Drude at Johannisfriedhof in Dresden.

He is known best for his research in the field of plant geography, that included mapping of the world's different floristic zones. With Adolf Engler (1844-1930), he was co-editor of Die Vegetation der Erde (1896-1928).

The plant species Ferula drudeana was named in his honor.

== Principal works ==
- Atlas der Pflanzenverbreitung, 1887
- Handbuch der Pflanzengeographie, 1890
- Deutschlands Pflanzengeographie, 1896-
- Die Ökologie der Pflanzen, 1914.
