= Orto botanico di Palermo =

Botanical garden and research and educational institution in Palermo, Italy

- Palermo Botanical Garden
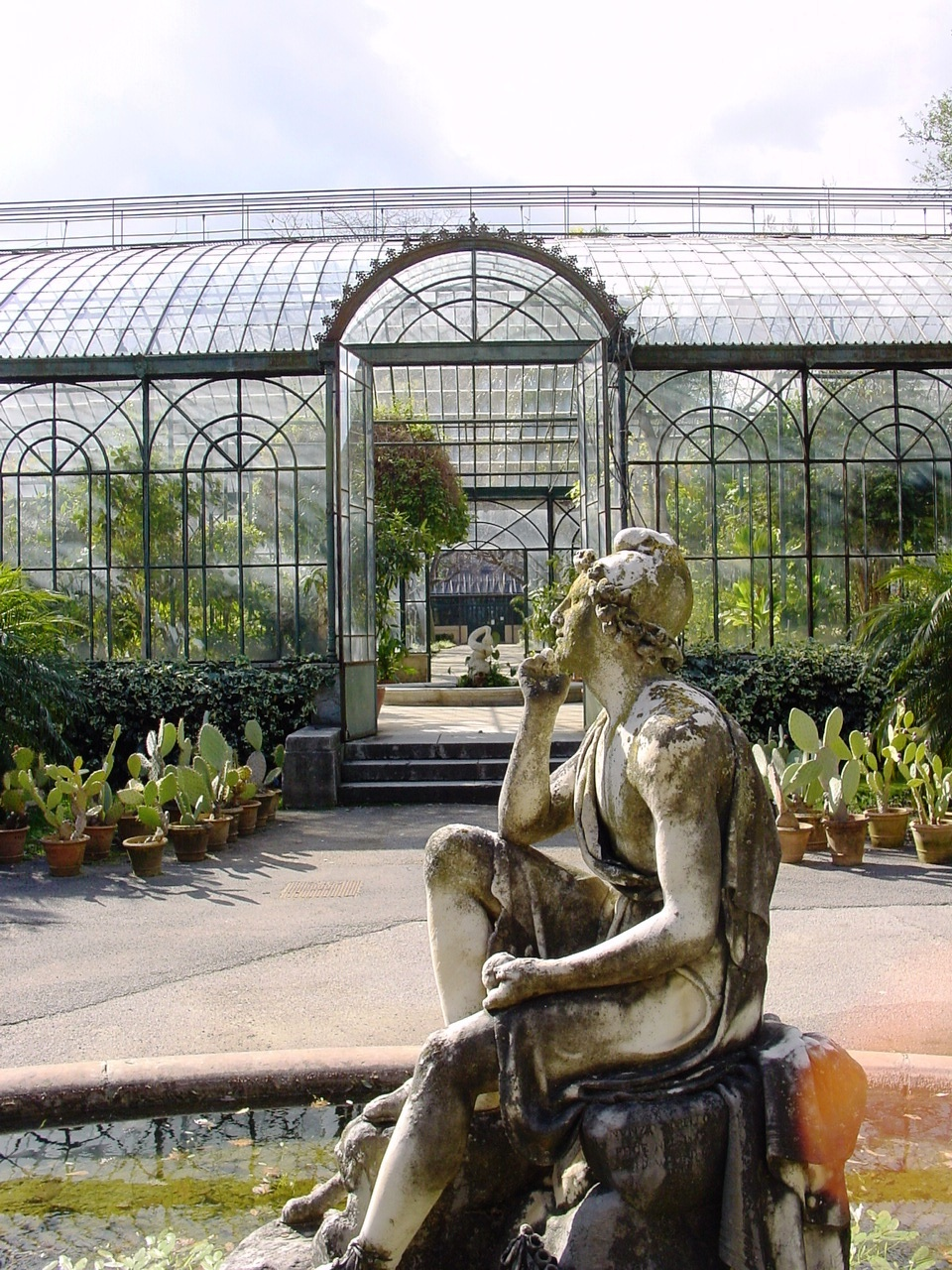
- Entrance of the Giardino d'Inverno ("Winter Garden").

- Location within Italy
- Type: Botanical garden
- Location: Via Lincoln, 2, 90133 Palermo PA, Italy
- Coordinates: 38°06′45″N 13°22′21″E
- Area: 30 acres (12 ha)
- Opened: 1779

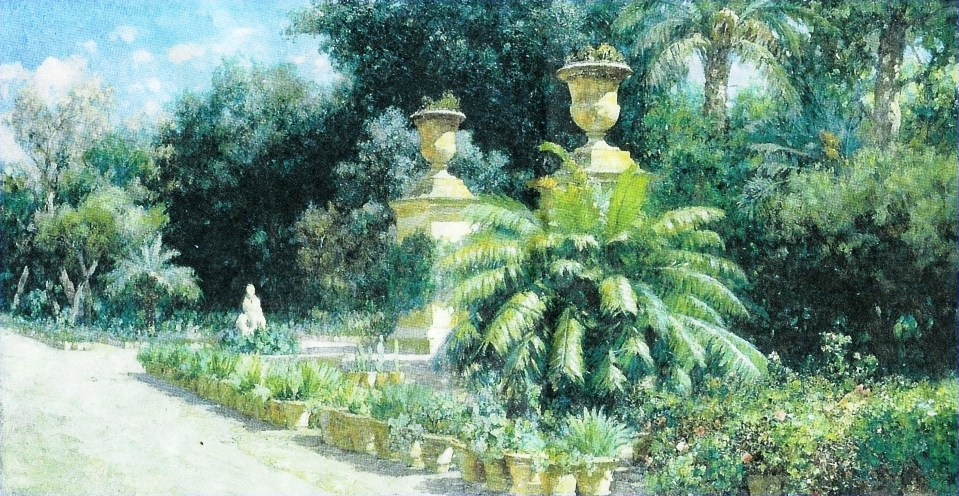
L'Orto botanico di Palermo by Francesco Lojacono.

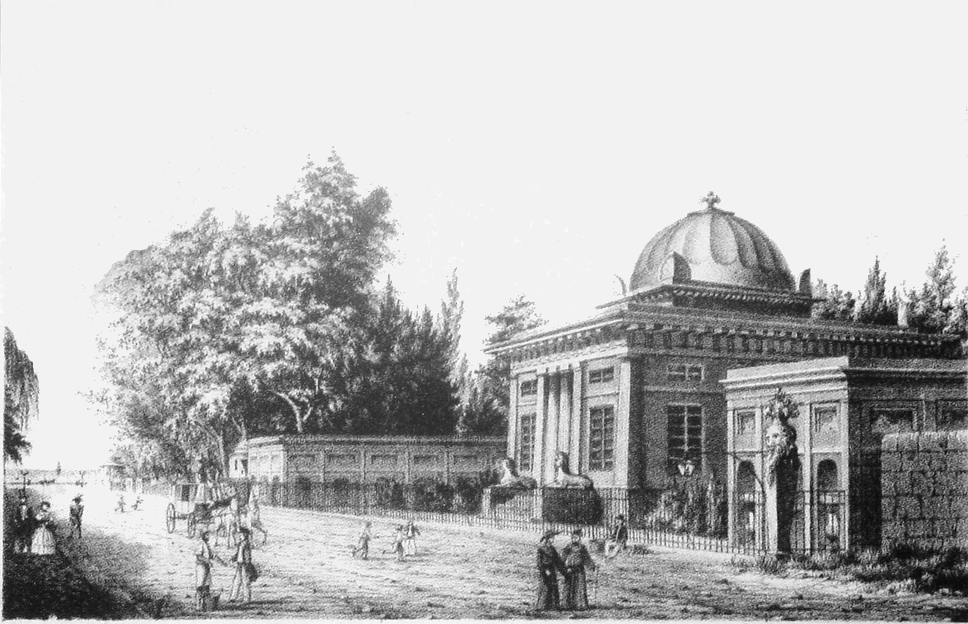
Palermo - Historical view of the Botanical Garden.

The Orto Botanico di Palermo (Palermo Botanical Garden) is both a botanical garden and a research and educational institution of the Department of Botany of the University of Palermo. The garden lies within the city of Palermo, Italy at 10 m (33 ft) above sea-level. It covers about 0.12 km^{2} (30 acres) on top of red soil that has evolved on a limestone tuff substratum.

== Brief history ==
The earliest beginnings of the gardens go back to 1779, when the Accademia dei Regi Studi created the chair of "Botany and medicinal properties". A modest plot of land was allocated to develop a small botanical garden dedicated to the cultivation of plants with medicinal benefits, for the twin objectives of general learning and improving public health.

Initially a site near Porta Carini utilized a site of the former fortified bastions facing the seaside from the walls of the city. These bastions were demolished in 1774–1778 under the praetorship of Antonino La Grua Talamanca, marchese de Regalmici, and later Prince of Carini, and reassigned for the botanical gardens. This initial garden allotment soon proved too small, and in 1786 it was decided to move to the present site, right next to the Piano di Sant'Erasmo, best remembered for the unfortunate events that occurred there during the Spanish Inquisition. The site had been orchards belonging to the former villa Giulia. Patronizing the development was the praetor Bernardo Filangieri, count of San Marco and the noblemen Giovanni Battista Paterno Asmondo and Ignazio Vanni.

In 1789 construction of the main part of the administrative buildings of the garden commenced in a neoclassical style. It is constructed with a central building, the Gymnasium, and two side buildings, the Tepidariumand the Caldarium, designed by the Frenchman Léon Dufourny, who had also designed a part of the oldest section of garden, right next to the Gymnasium. Its rectangular layout is divided into four quadrangles, within which the species are categorised according to Carl Linnaeus' system of classification. The new garden was opened in 1795; in the ensuing years it was improved, with the Aquarium (1798), a great pool hosting numerous species of aquatic plants, and the serra Maria Carolina (or Maria Carolina glasshouse), completed in 1823. The huge Ficus macrophylla, which is an emblem and a well-known attraction of the modern garden, was imported from Norfolk Island (Australia), in 1845. Today's area, some 10 hectares, was reached in 1892, following successive extensions. In 1913 the Giardino coloniale (Colonial garden) was developed alongside the botanic gardens, but that no longer exists. The gardens have been managed by the Department of Botany since 1985.

=== Chronological listing of the directors of the gardens ===
- 1795–1812 Giuseppe Tineo
- 1814–1856 Vincenzo Tineo
- 1856–1892 Agostino Todaro
- 1892–1921 Antonino Borzì
- 1921–1923 Domenico Lanza
- 1923–1928 Luigi Buscalioni
- 1928–1939 Luigi Montemartini
- 1939–1968 Francesco Bruno
- 1968–1971 Antonino De Leo
- 1971–1976 Vittorio Camarrone
- 1976–1990 Andrea Di Martino
- 1990–1996 Francesco Maria Raimondo
- 1996–1998 Andrea Di Martino
- 1998–2003 Salvatore Trapani
- 2003– ... Francesco Maria Raimondo

== Buildings, features and the collection ==
=== Gymnasium, Calidarium and Tepidarium ===
The central neo-classical building, known as the Gymnasium, is located near the main entrance gate. Originally it was the main office of the Schola Regia Botanice (school of botany), the Herbarium, the library and the director's office.

Two smaller buildings are located either side of the Gymnasium in perfect symmetry. To this day they are called the Calidarium and the Tepidarium because originally they housed plants from warm and temperate zones respectively (caldo meaning "hot" in Italian).

=== Linneian section ===
This is the oldest section of the gardens, laid out in a rectangular shape and divided into four quadrangles, the "quatrains" (or quartini). Each quatrain is further divided into flowerbeds, within which the plants were originally organised along the lines of the Linneian system of classification. The design of this section has gradually changed over time to display certain specimens at the expense of others that are now gone. At the centre of this section, is the particularly evocative “cross”, the small plaza that results from the intersection of the central axis (the Viale centrale) with the tree lined avenue of palms (the Viale delle palme).

=== The Aquarium and other water features ===
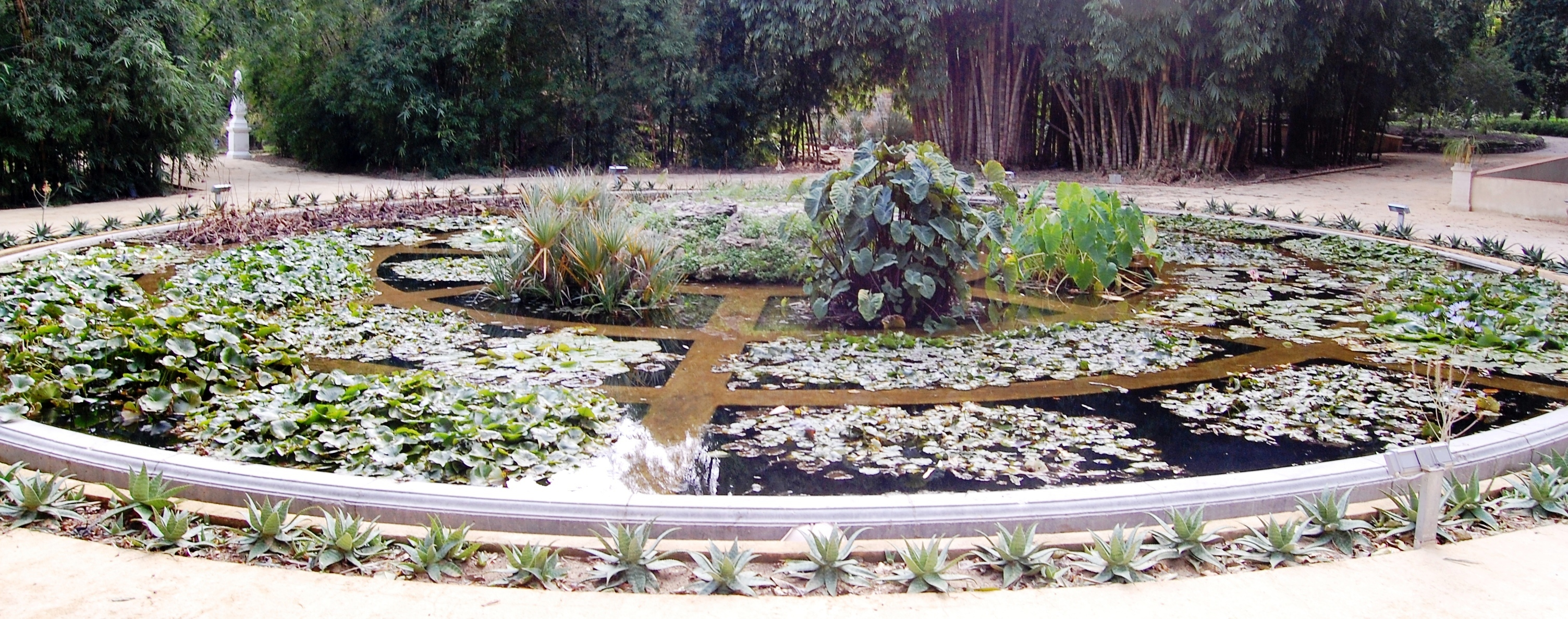
Aquarium

The Aquarium, a large round pool divided into 24 sections, is located at the end of the central avenue. The design consists of three concentric rings which are divided into 8 wedges, each being a home to a variety of acqautic flora.

The "lagoon" is located a few metres further down from the Acquariam and is another ample water feature in which the plants are arranged informally. Other smaller ponds are located in the quatrains of the Linneian section.

=== The greenhouses ===
Over time the gardens have benefitted from the development of a series of greenhouses that currently comprise a surface area of some 1,300 mq.

The oldest of these greenhouses is the serra Maria Carolina (serra is Italian for greenhouse), a gift from the Queen of Naples, Maria Carolina of Austria, also known as the Giardino d'Inverno (the winter garden). Originally it was constructed of wood and heated by stoves, over the course of the second half of the 19th century, it was completely rebuilt of cast-iron.

Other greenhouses include:

- the greenhouse of succulents, containing plants from hot-arid zones;
- the experimental greenhouse, that currently house bananas and papaya;
- the greenhouse of the region, containing plants of the warm-humid zones;
- the greenhouse for the preservation of succulents, an annex of the Department of Botany;
- the greenhouse of ferns.

=== Bioecological and geographic zone ===
In this section plants are arranged according to bioecological and geographic criteria. Here one finds the Giardino a succulente ("Garden of succulents"), consisting of an assortment of plants from the arid zones of Africa; the Palmetum; the Cycadetum; e la collinetta mediterranea (mediterranean hillside) which includes various significant species endemic to the Mediterranean, including some specimens which represent rare and endangered species.

=== Experimental and research zone ===
In the experimental zone, situated to the side of the Winter Garden, tropical and subtropical plants are cultivated for the purposes of research. Studies currently in train or recently undertaken include those on cotton, vegetables, sugar cane and sorghum. The zone dedicated to plants of a practical application, which extends over the south west part of the gardens, consists of terrain set apart for plants yielding a variety of oils, resins and fibres.

=== Engler's zone ===
Also known as the nuovo settore (the new zone), it comprises the southern section of the gardens within which the plants are arranged in accordance with the classification system of Engler. The species are partitioned into three sections, each dedicated in turn to the gymnosperms, the angiosperms, the dicotyledons and the liliopsida.

=== The herbarium ===
The modern Herbarium mediterraneum, accommodated within a few buildings adjacent to the gardens, covers a surface area of some 6,000 m^{2}.

The main part of the collection comprises the Erbario Siculo and the Erbario Generale of the Department of Botany, estimated to be around 50,000 and 200,000 specimens respectively. Of the latter group, around a quarter represent plants native to the mediterranean.

The non Sicilian specimens are mainly from Portugal, Spain, France, Corsica, Sardinia, Greece, Crete, Cyprus, Algeria and Egypt.

It also includes around 2,000 specimens of algae, 1,600 of lichen, 4,700 of bryophyte and a thousand odd of fungus.

=== Gene bank ===
The gene bank, having been started in 1993, is part of a broader project to protect the genetic material of the region's flora.

The main objective of the bank is the conservation ex situ, both short and long term, of all seeds endemic to the region, rare or endangered. Once they have been collected, the seeds are immediately treated and conserved in ampoules, all managed by the institution and available for exchange with others. The seeds are periodically tested for their propensity to germinate.

The bank forms part of the RIBES network (Rete Italiana delle Banche per la conservazione Ex-Situ del germoplasma).

== Summary of the species present ==
(See also the full list of species of plants growing in the gardens further below).

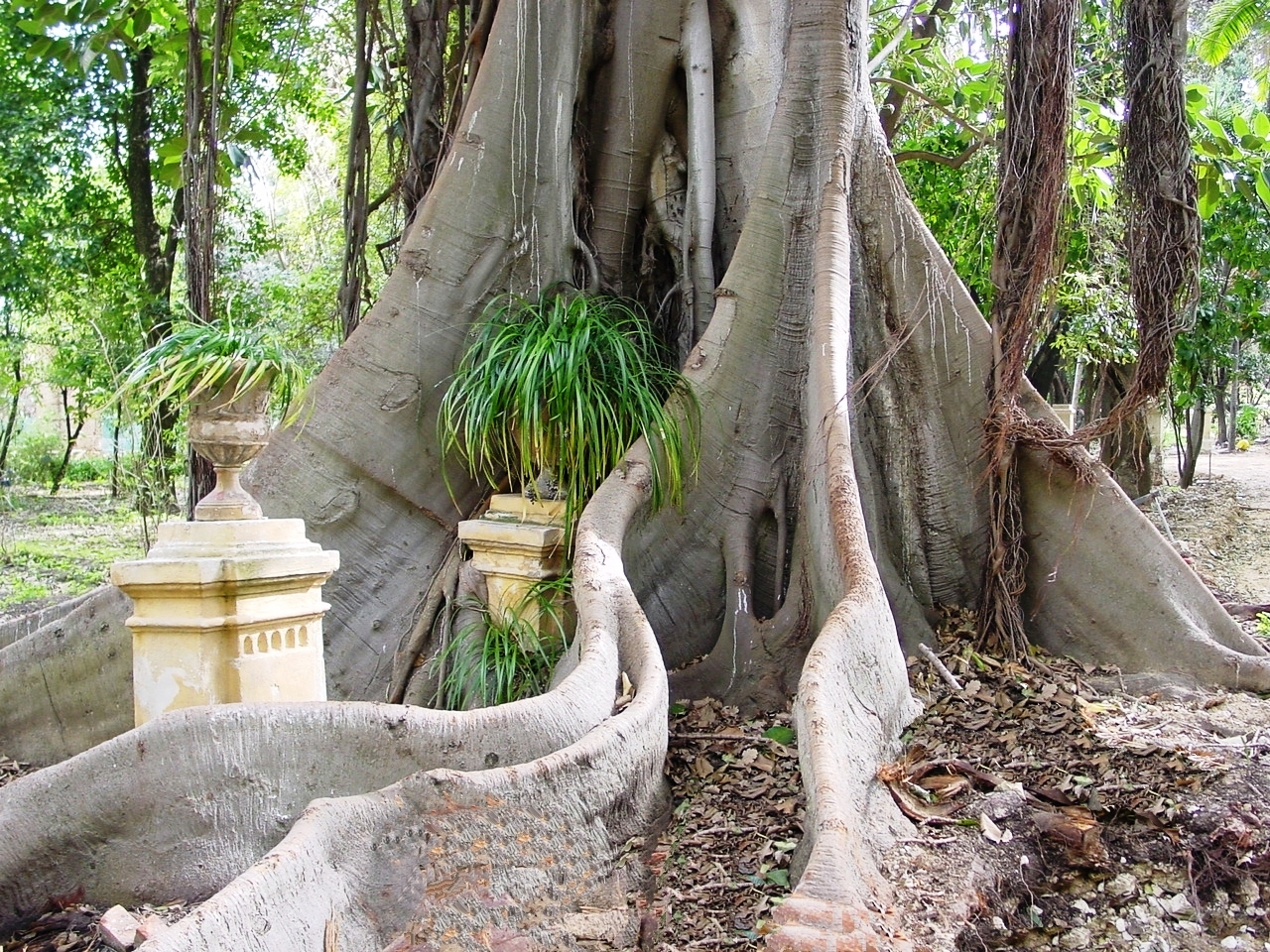
The typical aerial roots of the Ficus macrophylla (or the Moreton Bay fig)

The gardens are currently home to at least 12,000 different species.

Having been developed during the great age of exploration, between the second half of the 19th century and the first decades of the 20th century the gardens became an important point of reference for the bigger botanical gardens of Northern Europe. Because of Palermo's favourable climate, they transferred a good number of unknown, poorly classified and exotic tropical species there. In this context, the relationship between the Berlin Botanic Garden, under the stewardship of Adolf Engler, and those of the originating areas of the New World proved to be extremely important.

As an illustrative example of the role of the Palermo Botanic Garden, consider the introduction into the Mediterranean of the mandarin (Citrus deliciosa) and the loquat (Eriobotrya japonica).

The early Linneian plantings consisted of 1,580 different species, of which 658 still exist. Of these specimens, the most notable is the mighty Ginkgo biloba.

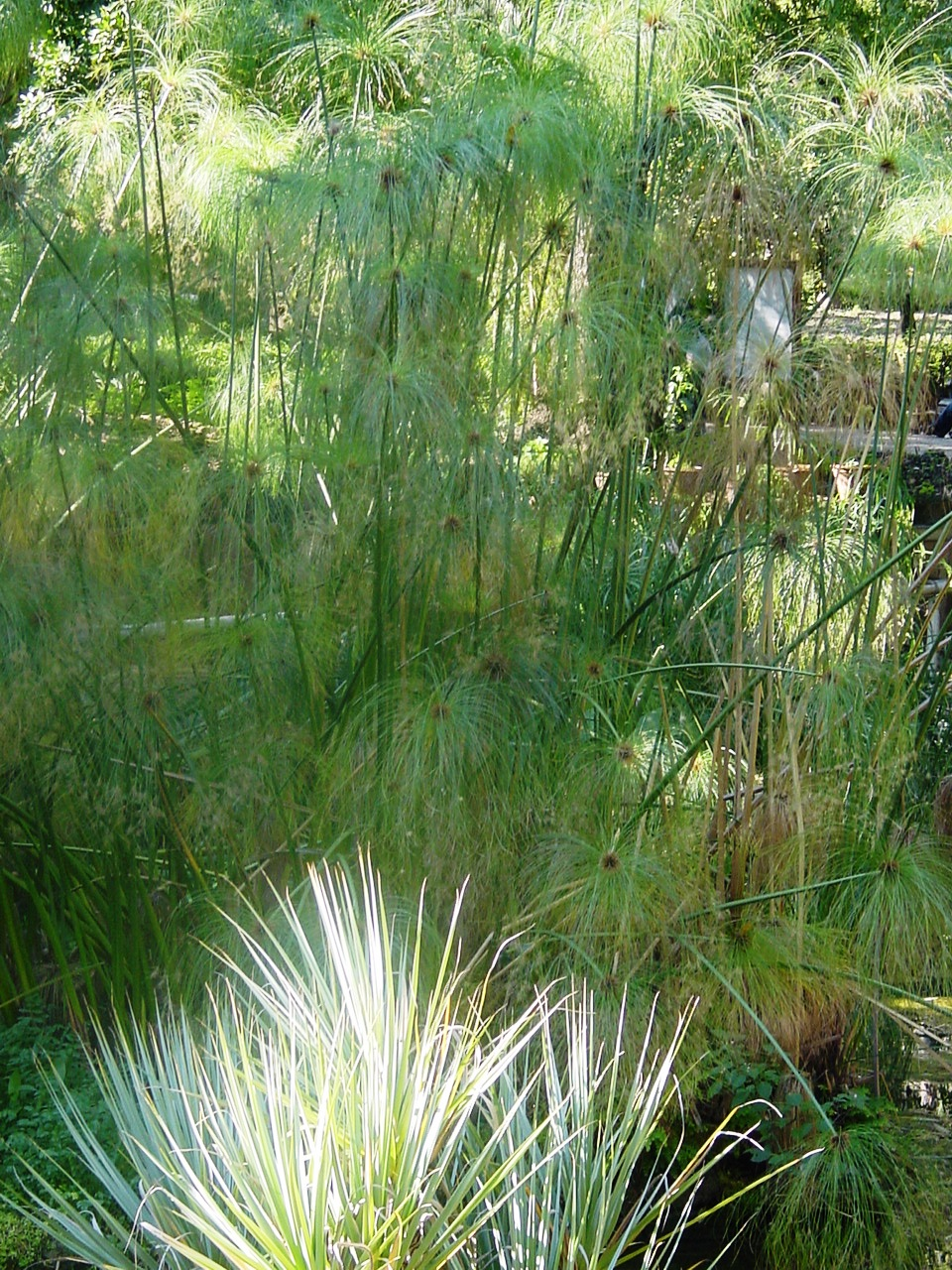
The Laghetto of papyrus

In the Aquarium many species of Nymphaea are to be found, including Nymphaea alba, Nymphaea tuberosa hybrids of Nymphaea × marliacea, the multicoloured Nuphar lutea and Nelumbum nucifera. Moreover, in the areas further in that are not submerged but humid nevertheless, one finds Alocasia, Colocasia, Zantedeschia, while in a nearby pond, the so-called laghetto, Egyptian papyrus (Cyperus papyrus) and other cyperaceae such as Scirpus lacustris and Cyperus alternifolius are absolutely thriving.

Various species of bamboo grow nearby and directly behind here, atop a small artificial hill, there is a healthy specimen of the drago tree (Dracaena draco). Not too far away one can see the tallest plant of the gardens, a magnificent Araucaria columnaris, and the largest overall in terms of volume, a gigantic specimen of Ficus macrophylla, with its typical aerial roots, imported from Norfolk Island (a territory of Australia in the Pacific Ocean), in 1845. It is also a native of the east coast of Australia and is known as the Moreton Bay fig.

The giardino a succulente (the garden of succulents) of the bioecological zone is home to numerous species of the genus Aloe and various other plants of arid regions, including Cereus, Crassula, Euphorbia and Opuntia. Alongside the collection of succulents, there is a huge specimen of Ficus rubiginosa, recreating an environment reminiscent of a tropical jungle.

In the area containing Cycadetum there are certain species of Cycadales that have a notable history. Of these we have Cycas revoluta, donated by Queen Maria Carolina in 1793, was the first such specimen to find a permanent home in Europe. In the following stage of the gardens' development Zamiaceae Ceratozamia mexicana and Dioon edule, were both introduced from Mexico, as was Cycas circinalis, an elegant species from the Indian sub-continent. In 1997 the collection was further improved by the acquisition of a variety of worthy specimens, including Dioon spinulosum, Encephalartos altensteinii, Encephalartos longifolius, Encephalartos villosus, Macrozamia moorei and Zamia furfuracea.

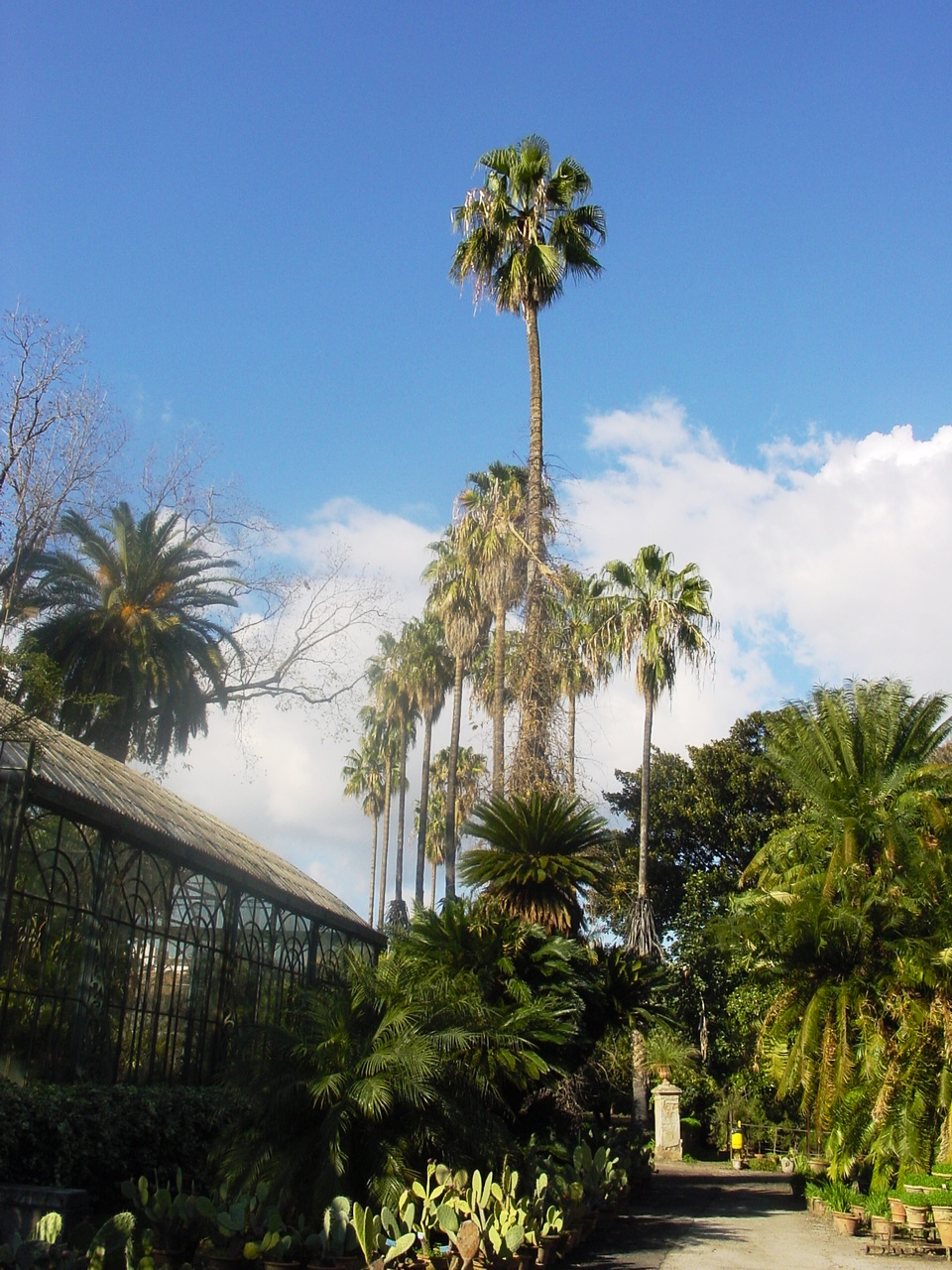
Washingtonia filifera

In the area dedicated to palms one can find Chamaerops humilis, the only palm native to Sicily, and numerous exotic palms, in which the gardens are particularly blessed. Amongst both potted and fully cultivated specimens, one can count a good 34 genera and around 80 species. The genus Washingtonia is represented by W. filifera, that flowered in Palermo for the first time ever, and by W. robusta. In the genus Phoenix, apart from the common date (Phoenix dactylifera) there are also P. rupicola, P. reclinata, P. canariensis, P. roebelenii and P. teophrastii. There are also many other genera: Chamaedorea, Brahea, Sabal, Erythea, Livistona, Howea and Trachycarpus.

The Giardino d'Inverno (Winter Garden) is home to a number of species native to the warmer climes of Africa, Central America, South America, Asia and Australia. Amongst those that are worth a brief mention, we have the coffee plant (Coffea arabica), papaya (Carica papaya), numerous species of Bougainvillea, cinnamon (Cinnamomum ceylanicum), (Parmentiera cereifera) and mimosa (Mimosa spegazzinii). In the serra della Regione (glasshouse of the regions), there are potted specimens of (Ravenala madagascariensis) (the traveller's palm) and various species of Anthurium, Codiaeum, Pandanus and other plants from tropical and equatorial climes. Two smaller glasshouses are located alongside this one, housing orchids and carnivorous plants respectively. Also notable is the collection of succulents contained in the similarly titled glasshouse, amongst which we find specimens of Echinocactus grusonii of considerable dimensions.

In the Settore Sperimentale e delle Piante Utili (Experimental zone and zone of practical plantings) plants which produce foodstuffs are exhibited, such as sugarcane (Saccharum officinarum) and (Sorghum saccharatum), both used for the production of sugar; avocado (Persea americana), various cultivars of banana (Musa acuminata × balbisiana), pecan nut, not to mention an extensive collection of vegetable plants with over 100 cultivars of great historical interest and hugely important in terms of the conservation of a local gene pool. Lastly we have the medicinal plantings, including Artemisia absinthium, Datura stramonium, ginseng (Withania somnifera), la camphour (Cinnamomum camphora) and the opium poppy (Papaver somniferum).

A

- Acalypha hispida
- Aeonium leucoblepharum
- Agapanthus umbellatus
- Aloe arborescens
- Aloe saponaria
- Aloe thraskii
- Aloe xcaesia
- Aloe xriccobonii
- Aloe xspinosissima
- Aloiampelos ciliaris (syn. Aloe ciliaris)
- Annona cherimolia
- Antholyza aethiopica
- Antigonon leptopus
- Araucaria columnaris
- Archontophoenix alexandrae
- Archontophoenix cunninghamiana
- Arenga engleri
- Artemisia absinthium
- Astrophytum capricorne
- Astrophytum myriostigma

B

- Bambusa macroculmis
- Begonia maxima
- Begonia x ricinifolia
- Bombax ceiba
- Bougainvillea aurantiaca
- Bougainvillea splendens
- Bougainvillea trolli
- Bougainvillea valverde
- Brahea armata
- Buddleia davidi
- Butia capitata

C

- Calliandra portoricensis
- Calodendrum capensis
- Caralluma europaea
- Carica papaya
- Carica quercifolia
- Carya olivaeformis
- Chamaerops humilis
- Cinnamomum camphora
- Cinnamomum ceylanicum
- Coffea arabica
- Caryota mitis
- Centaurea ucriae
- Ceratozamia mexicana
- Cereus peruvianus
- Chamaedorea ernesti-augusti
- Chamaedorea metallica
- Chamaedorea oblongata
- Chorisia speciosa
- Citrus maxima
- Citrus paradisi
- Citrus reticulata
- Citrus volkameriana
- Clivia nobilis
- Coreopsis tripteris
- Crescentia alata
- Crinum longiflorum
- Cycas circinalis
- Cycas revoluta
- Cyperus alternifolius
- Cyperus papyrus

D

- Datura stramonium
- Dionaea muscipula
- Dioon edule
- Dioon spinulosum
- Doryanthes palmeri
- Dracaena draco
- Drosera longifolia
- Drosera rotundifolia
- Dypsis decaryi

E

- Echidnopsis cereiformis
- Echinocactus grusonii
- Echinocactus ingens
- Echinocereus blanckii
- Encephalartos altensteinii
- Encephalartos arenarius
- Encephalartos horridus
- Encephalartos longifolius
- Encephalartos villosus
- Encephalartos woodii × natalensis
- Eriobotrya japonica
- Erythrina corallodendron
- Erythrina crista-galli
- Erythrina humeana
- Erythrina viarum
- Euphorbia candelabrum
- Euphorbia caput-medusae
- Euphorbia dendroides
- Euphorbia lactea
- Euphorbia nivulia

F

- Fatsia papyrifera
- Ficus altissima
- Ficus aspera var. parcelli
- Ficus benghalensis
- Ficus benjamina
- Ficus bibracteata
- Ficus carica
- Ficus elastica
- Ficus elastica var. decora
- Ficus elastica var. variegata
- Ficus heterophylla
- Ficus hispida
- Ficus indica
- Ficus infectoria
- Ficus lyrata
- Ficus macrophylla
- Ficus magnifolia
- Ficus microcarpa
- Ficus palmata
- Ficus pumila
- Ficus religiosa
- Ficus sycomorus
- Ficus watkinsiana
- Furcraea selloa

G

- Ginkgo biloba
- Grevillea robusta
- Grewia malococca
- Gymnocalycium tilcarense

H

- Heteropterys chrysophylla
- Howea forsteriana

I

- Iochroma coccinea

J

- Jacobinia magnifica
- Jubaea chilensis

L

- Livistona decipiens
- Livistona mariae

M

- Macadamia ternifolia
- Macrozamia communis
- Macrozamia moorei
- Mamillaria centricirrha
- Mammillaria elongata
- Mammillaria perbella
- Melaleuca glaberrima
- Melaleuca linariifolia
- Mimosa spegazzinii
- Musa cavendishi
- Musa × paradisiaca

N

- Nelumbo nucifera
- Nepenthes distillatoria
- Nolina stricta
- Notocactus apricus
- Notocactus rutilans
- Nymphaea alba
- Nymphaea × marliacea
- Nymphaea tuberosa
- Nuphar lutea

O

- Opuntia engelmannii
- Osteomeles schwerinae

P

- Parmentiera cereifera
- Papaver somniferum
- Paulownia tomentosa
- Pennisetum setaceum
- Peperomia caperata
- Persea americana
- Phoenix canariensis
- Phoenix dactylifera
- Phoenix reclinata
- Phoenix roebelenii
- Phoenix rupicola
- Phoenix teophrastii
- Pinus banksiana
- Poinciana gilliesii
- Pseudolobivia aurea

R

- Ravenala madagascariensis
- Ravenea rivularis
- Rhapis excelsa
- Rhopalostylis cheesemanii
- Rhopalostylis sapida
- Rhizophora mangle
- Russelia equisetiformis

S

- Sabal bermudana
- Sabal minor
- Saccharum officinarum
- Sagittaria lancifolia
- Sarracenia purpurea
- Scirpus lacustris
- Serenoa repens
- Sophora secundiflora
- Sorghum saccharatum
- Sparrmannia africana
- Stapelia leendertziae
- Stapelia variegata
- Strophanthus scandens
- Syagrus romanzoffiana

T

- Trithrinax campestris
- Tipuana speciosa

W

- Washingtonia filifera
- Washingtonia robusta
- Wigandia caracasana
- Withania somnifera

Y

- Yucca aloifolia
- Yucca elephantipes

Z

- Zamia floridana
- Zamia furfuracea
- Zephyranthes rosea

== Odd spot ==
For a few years now the gardens have been home to a colony of parrots of the species Psittacula krameri, having escaped from the aviaries of the nearby Villa Giulia and are perfectly at home in the subtropical habitat of the gardens.

== Useful information ==
The gardens are open to visitors during the working week from 9.00am to 5.00pm (from April to October to 6.00pm). Weekend hours are from 8.30am to 1.30pm.

E-mail: info@ortobotanico.palermo.it

== See also ==
- Palermo
- Botanical garden
- List of botanical gardens in Italy
