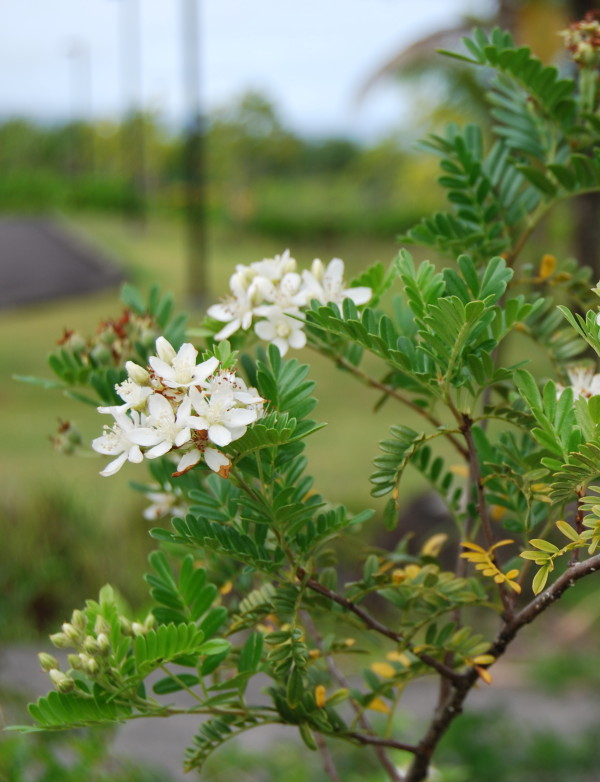
- Osteomeles anthyllidifolia (ʻŪlei)

Scientific classification
- Kingdom: Plantae
- Clade: Tracheophytes
- Clade: Angiosperms
- Clade: Eudicots
- Clade: Rosids
- Order: Rosales
- Family: Rosaceae
- Subfamily: Amygdaloideae
- Tribe: Maleae
- Subtribe: Malinae
- Genus: Osteomeles; Lindl.

= Osteomeles =

Genus of flowering plants

Osteomeles is a genus of plants in the rose family, Rosaceae. They are shrubs native to eastern Asia, with compound leaves, opposite leaf arrangement, and small pome fruit. The fruits of all species in this genus are edible.

== Taxonomy ==
The genus has sometimes been considered to include South American species of Hesperomeles which, like Osteomeles, have only one ovule per locule and hard pyrenes. But Hesperomeles notably have simple leaves, and recent molecular phylogenetics suggest that the two genera are only distantly related.

== Selected species ==
- Osteomeles anthyllidifolia (Sm.) Lindl.
- Osteomeles schwerinae C.K.Schneid. (China)
- Osteomeles subrotunda K.Koch (China and Ryukyu islands)
