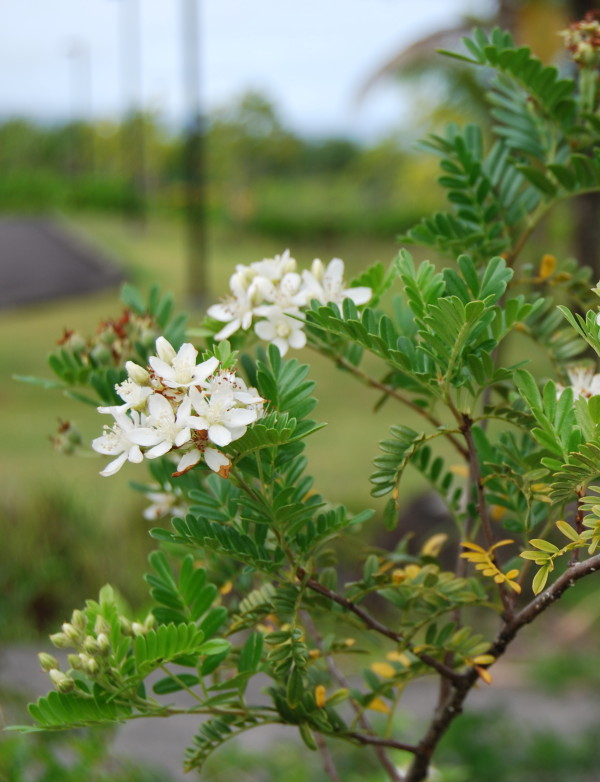

Scientific classification
- Kingdom: Plantae
- Clade: Tracheophytes
- Clade: Angiosperms
- Clade: Eudicots
- Clade: Rosids
- Order: Rosales
- Family: Rosaceae
- Genus: Osteomeles
- Species: O. anthyllidifolia

Binomial name
- Osteomeles anthyllidifolia (Sm.) Lindl.

Synonyms
- Pyrus anthyllidifolia Sm.

= Osteomeles anthyllidifolia =

Species of shrub

Osteomeles anthyllidifolia, commonly called ʻŪlei, eluehe, uʻulei, Hawaiian rose, or Hawaiian hawthorn, is a species of flowering shrub in the rose family, Rosaceae, that is indigenous to Hawaiʻi (all islands but Kahoʻolawe and Niʻihau), the Cook Islands, Tonga, Pitcairn Island, and Rapa Iti, Taiwan and the Ryukyu Islands of Japan.

== Description ==
Osteomeles anthyllidifolia grows as either an erect shrub that reaches 3 metres (9.8 ft) or a spreading shrub. The compound leaves are alternately arranged on branches and divided into 15–25 leaflets. The small, oblong leaflets are 1.5 centimetres (0.59 in) long and 0.7 centimetres (0.28 in) wide. White flowers with five 7–11-millimetre (0.28–0.43 in) petals form clusters of three to six on the ends of branches. The fruit is white when ripe, 1.0 centimetre (0.39 in) in diameter, and contains yellow seeds that are 1.5 millimetres (0.059 in) in diameter.

=== Habitat ===
Osteomeles anthyllidifolia can be found in dry to mesic forests, shrublands, coastal areas, and lava plains at elevations of 2–2,320 metres (6.6–7,611.5 ft). It is a ruderal species, able to effectively compete with other plants on disturbed sites.

== Uses ==
=== Medicinal ===
The leaves and root bark are used on deep cuts; the seeds and buds are used as a laxative for children.

=== Non-medicinal ===
The wood of a mature Osteomeles anthyllidifolia is very strong, and Native Hawaiians used it to make ʻō (harpoons) with which they caught heʻe (octopuses). Ihe paheʻe (javelins), ihe (spears), ʻōʻō (digging sticks), hohoa (round kapa beaters) ʻiʻe kūkū (square kapa beaters), ʻūkēkē (musical bows), and ʻauamo (carrying sticks) were also made from the wood. Young, flexible O. anthyllidifolia branches were fashioned into the hoops of ʻaʻei. These were 25-foot (7.6 m) bag nets that were used in conjunction with kalo (taro) as bait to catch schools of ʻōpelu (Decapterus macarellus). The fruit is edible and was used to make a lavender dye.
