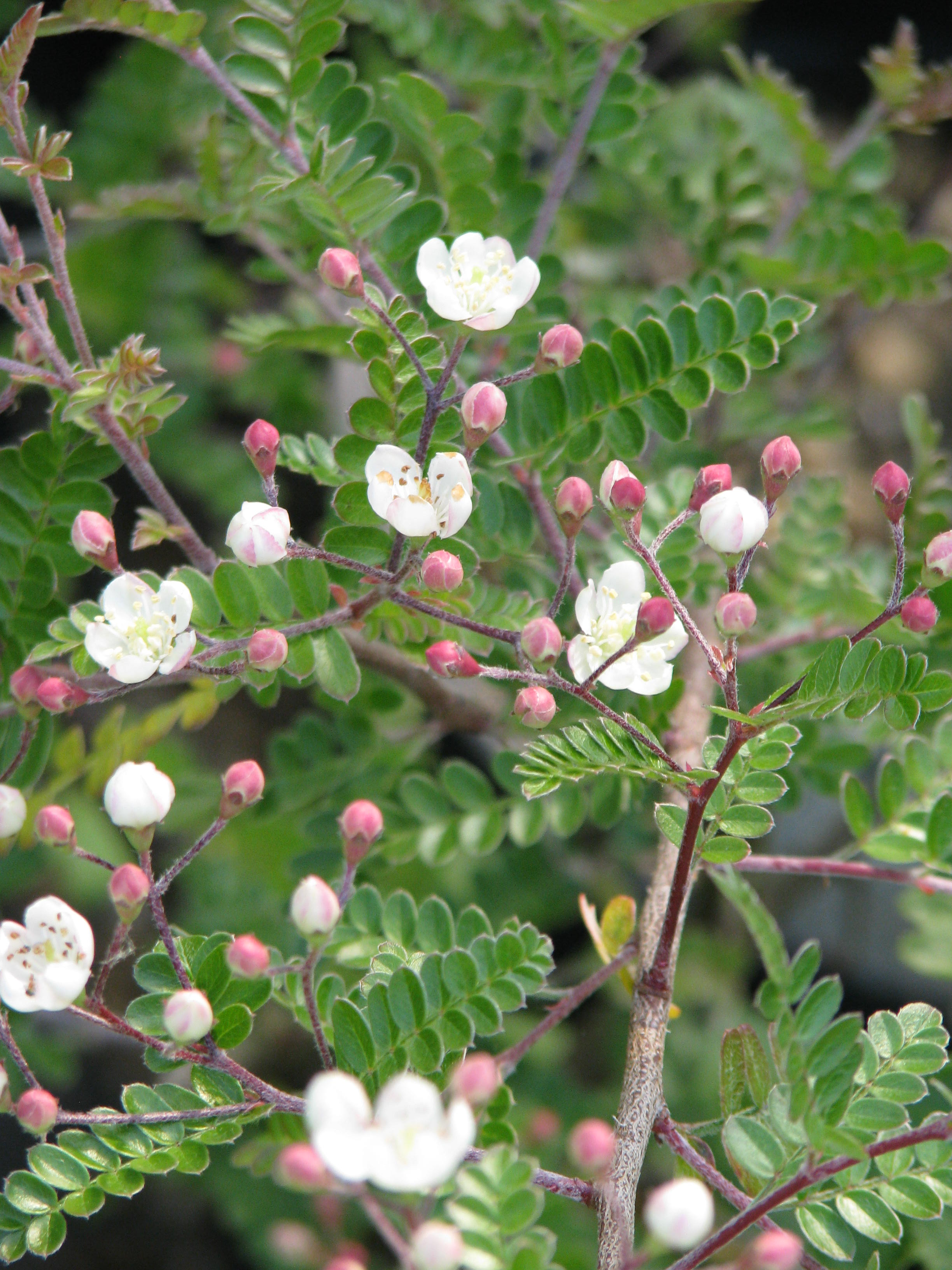

Scientific classification
- Kingdom: Plantae
- Clade: Tracheophytes
- Clade: Angiosperms
- Clade: Eudicots
- Clade: Rosids
- Order: Rosales
- Family: Rosaceae
- Genus: Osteomeles
- Species: O. subrotunda

Binomial name
- Osteomeles subrotunda K.Koch

= Osteomeles subrotunda =

Species of flowering plant

Osteomeles subrotunda is a species of plant native to China and the Ryukyu Islands of Japan. It has edible fruits that can be eaten raw. The fruit has a sweet flavor. It is grown as an ornamental plant. It is also used in bonsai.
