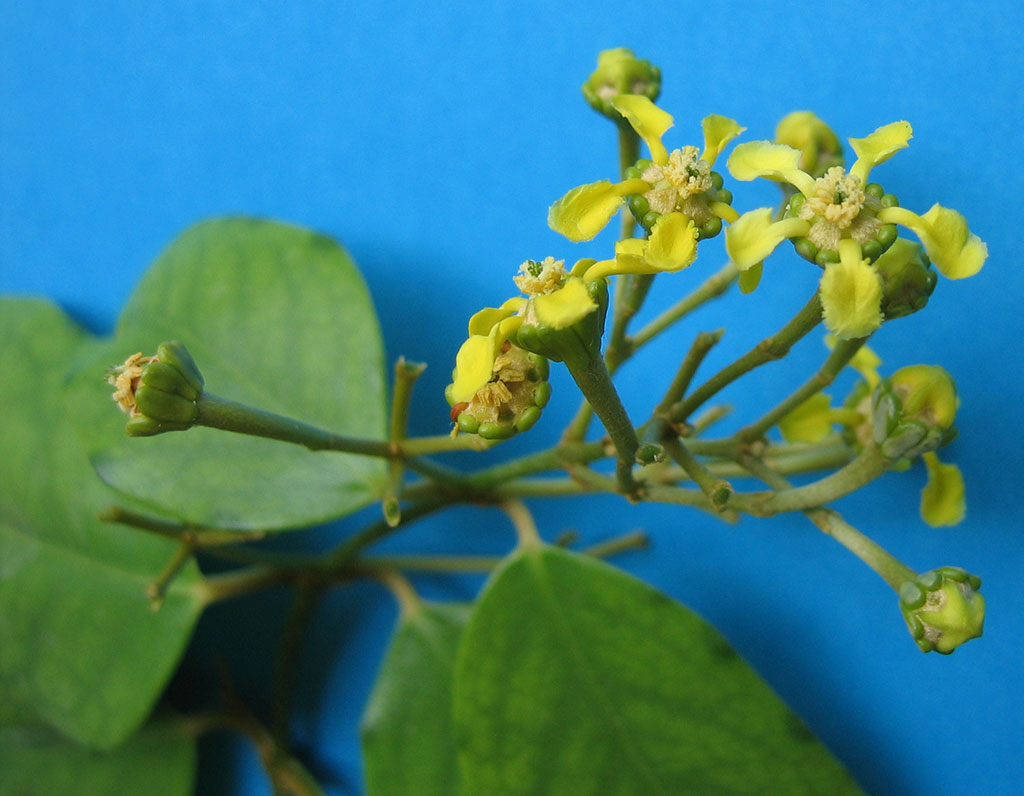
- Heteropterys chrysophylla Kunth

Scientific classification
- Kingdom: Plantae
- Clade: Tracheophytes
- Clade: Angiosperms
- Clade: Eudicots
- Clade: Rosids
- Order: Malpighiales
- Family: Malpighiaceae
- Genus: Heteropterys; H. B. K.

Species
- Over 140 species

= Heteropterys =

Genus of flowering plants

Heteropterys is a genus of flowering plants in the family Malpighiaceae. The genus Heteropterys comprises over 140 species of woody vines, shrubs, and small trees found in the New World tropics and subtropics from northern Mexico and the West Indies to northern Argentina and southeastern Brazil. One widespread, mostly Caribbean species, H. leona, is also found in low wet places along the coast of West Africa from Senegal to Angola.
