= Léon Dufourny =

French architect

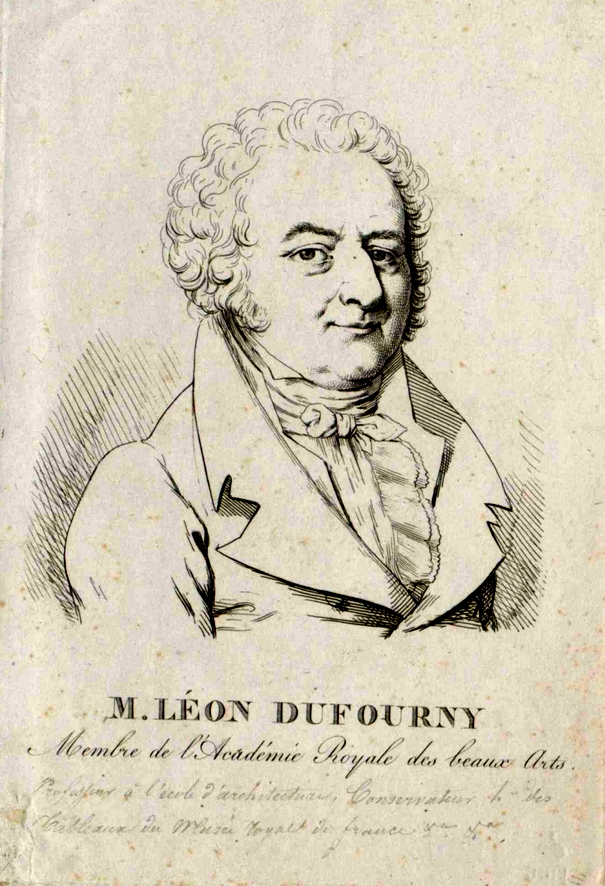
Léon Dufourny as a member of the Académie

Léon Dufourny (French pronunciation: [leɔ̃ dyfuʁni]; 5 March 1754, Paris – 16 November 1818, Paris) was a French Neoclassical architect.

== Biography ==
His father, Jean-Baptiste, was a wealthy textile merchant. His older brother, Pierre, was originally involved in the family business, but later became a revolutionary. He studied architecture with Julien-David Le Roy. In 1782, attracted by classical architecture, he went to Italy to study the ancient monuments. After travelling throughout Northern Italy, he spent some time in Rome.

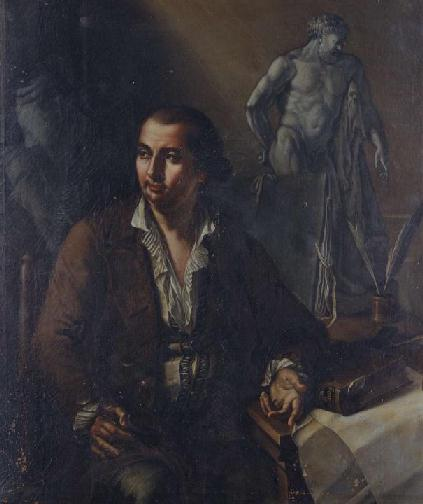
Dufourny in Italy (artist unknown)

From 1788 to 1793, he lived in Sicily, as a guest of the Kingdom of Naples. In Catania, he studied the reliefs at the Monastery of San Nicolò l'Arena. Arriving in Palermo in 1789, he immediately sought to make connections with the intelligentsia there. Soon, the Viceroy of Sicily, Francesco d'Aquino, Prince of Caramanico, was entrusting him with important commissions. This enabled him to introduce Neoclassical styles to an area that was dominated by the Baroque. Of particular note is the "Entrance Temple" for the new Botanical Gardens. It was the first building in Sicily in the Doric style, and began a trend.

In 1793, he was forced to leave Sicily and sail for Livorno, due to a state of hostility between the Kingdom of Naples and France. After travelling a bit more, he returned to Paris in 1795. The following year, he was elected to the Académie des Beaux-Arts, where he took Seat #3 for architecture, succeeding Pierre-Adrien Pâris, who had resigned. He was also appointed Chairman of the Funds Commission, and served on the Administrative Commission of the Institut de France.

He would return to Italy in 1801, as a Commissioner for the First Republic, to acquire art objects; including a copy of the Athena of Velletri, and items from the sculpture collection at the Palazzo Giustiniani. He was also an avid private collector of paintings and prints, but above all of antiquities, such as architectural elements and fragments, which he later used in his capacity as a teacher at the Académie.

As a conservator at the Louvre, he helped organize their collection. Following the death of his teacher, Le Roy, in 1803, he took his place as a Professor of Theory at the École des Beaux-Arts. His private collections, originally donated to the École, are now in the Louvre. He planned to publish a comprehensive work on the ancient and modern architecture of Sicily, but it was never completed. The manuscript is in the possession of the Bibliothèque Nationale de France.

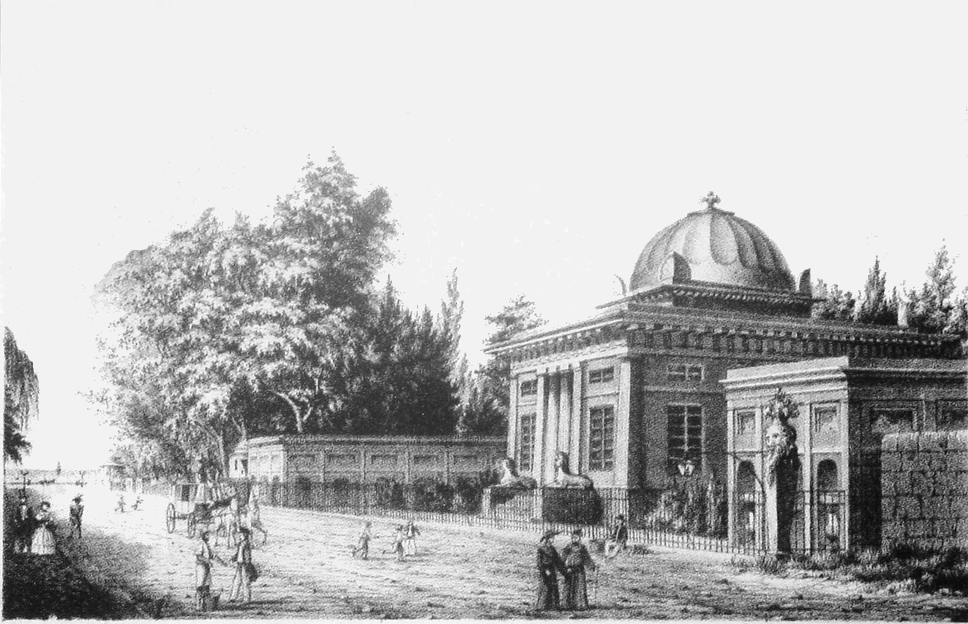
Historic view of the "Entrance Temple" at the Botanical Gardens

== Sources ==
- Journal de Léon Dufourny à Palerme, 8 juillet 1789-29 septembre 1793, translated by Raimondo A. Cannizzo as Diario di un giacobino a Palermo, 1789-1793, Fondazione Lauro Chiazzese della Sicilcassa, Palermo, 1991 ISBN 978-0-00-138404-0
- Liliane Dufour, La Sicilia del '700 nell'opera di Léon Dufourny, Giuseppe Pagnano (Ed.), Ediprint, 1996 ISBN 978-0-00-100313-2
- Pietro Burzotta, "Dall’Orto botanico al giardino del mondo. Le opere di Léon Dufourny in Sicilia", In: Lotus International #52, 1986, pp.112-127
