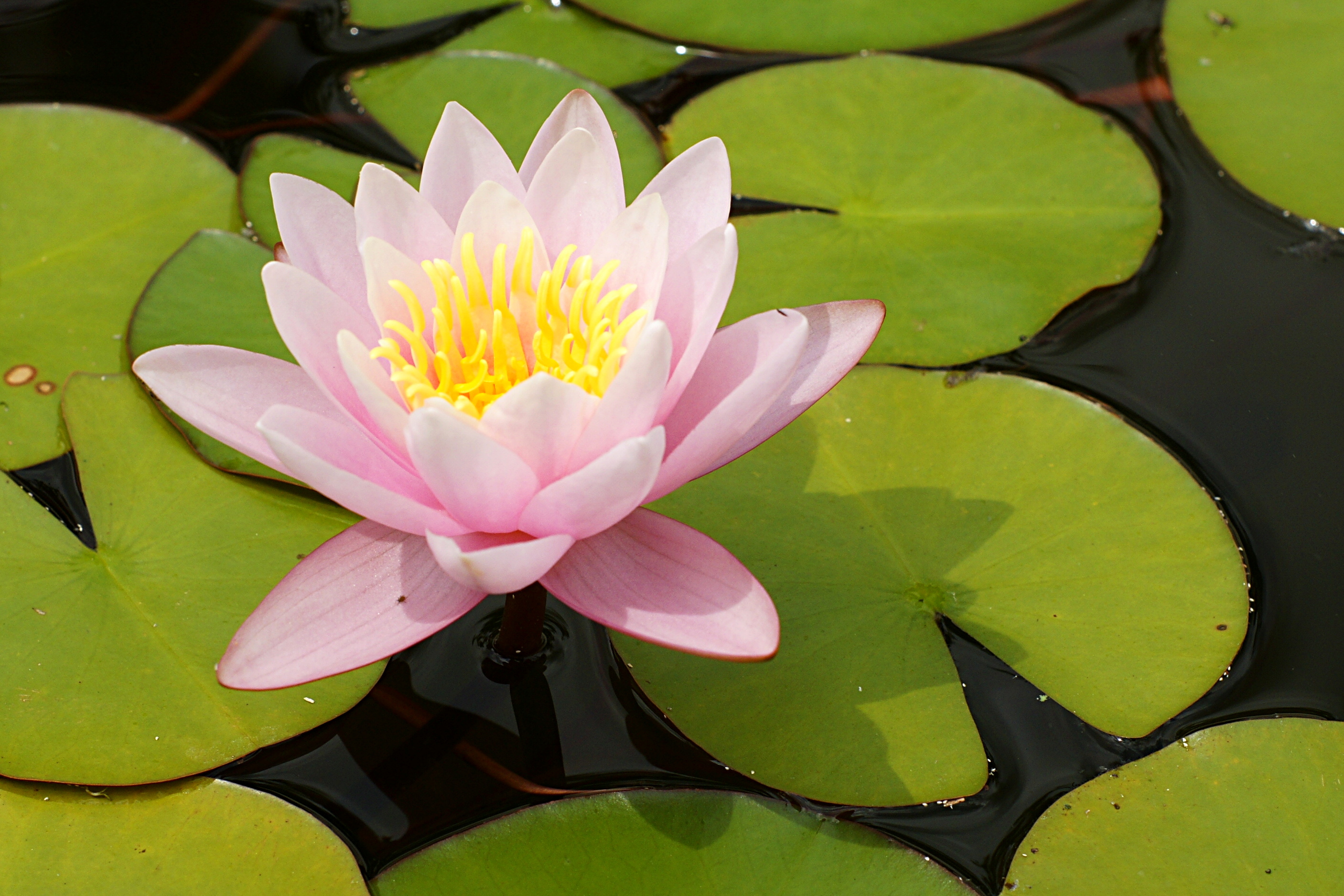
- Nymphaea × marliacea 'Rosea' with a pink flower

Scientific classification
- Kingdom: Plantae
- Clade: Tracheophytes
- Clade: Angiosperms
- Order: Nymphaeales
- Family: Nymphaeaceae
- Genus: Nymphaea
- Subgenus: Nymphaea subg. Nymphaea
- Species: N. × marliacea

Binomial name
- Nymphaea × marliacea Lat.-Marl.

Synonyms
- List: Nymphaea × andreana Lat.-Marl. ex André; Nymphaea × fulva Lat.-Marl. ex André; Nymphaea × marliacea var. albida Lat.-Marl. ex M.Vilm.; Nymphaea × marliacea var. carnea Lat.-Marl. ex M.Vilm.; Nymphaea × marliacea var. carnea E.D.Sturtev.; Nymphaea × marliacea var. chromatella (Regel) Lat.-Marl. ex M.Vilm.; Nymphaea × marliacea var. chromatella (Regel) E.D.Sturtev.; Nymphaea × marliacea chromatella Regel; Nymphaea × marliacea var. rosea Lat.-Marl. ex M.Vilm.; Nymphaea × marliacea var. rosea E.D.Sturtev.; Nymphaea × robinsoniana André; Nymphaea × robinsonii Anon.; Nymphaea × seigneuxii Lat.-Marl. ex André

= Nymphaea × marliacea =

Water lily hybrid

Nymphaea × marliacea is an invasive artificial waterlily hybrid of Nymphaea mexicana, Nymphaea alba and/or Nymphaea odorata. It has been naturalised in Australia, New Zealand, North America, and Europe.

== Description ==
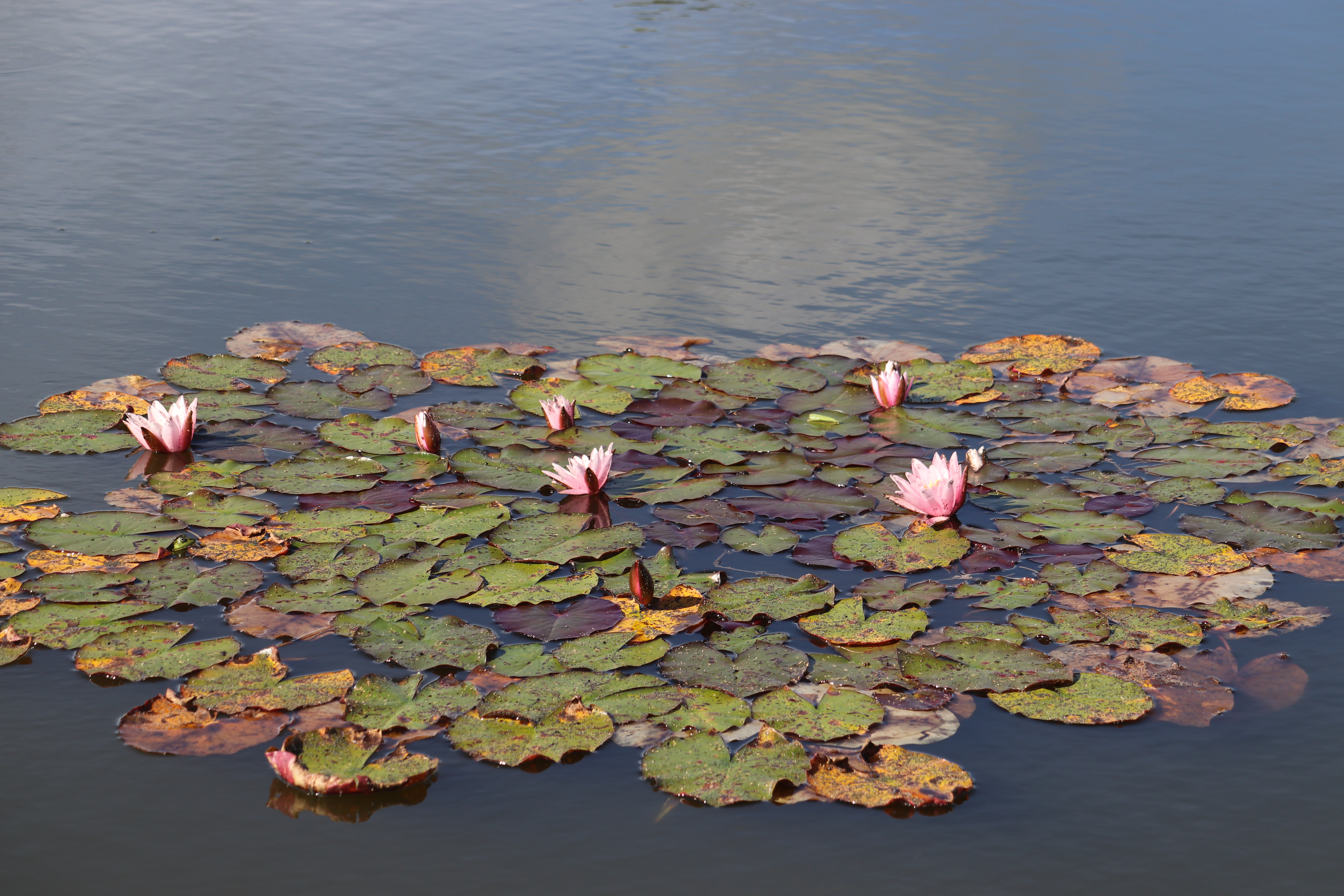
Nymphaea × marliacea growing in Overijssel, the Netherlands

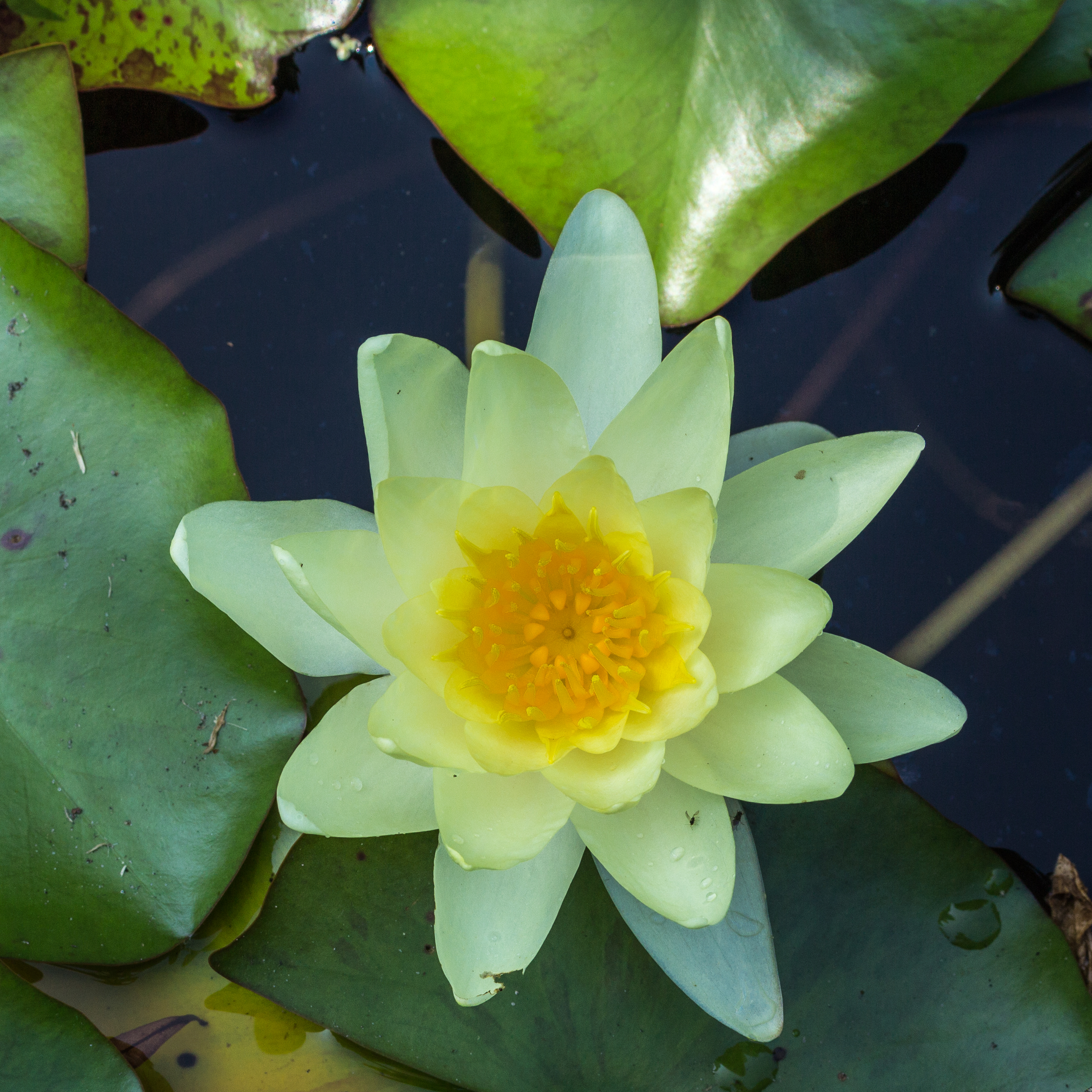
Nymphaea × marliacea 'Chromatella' with a yellowish flower

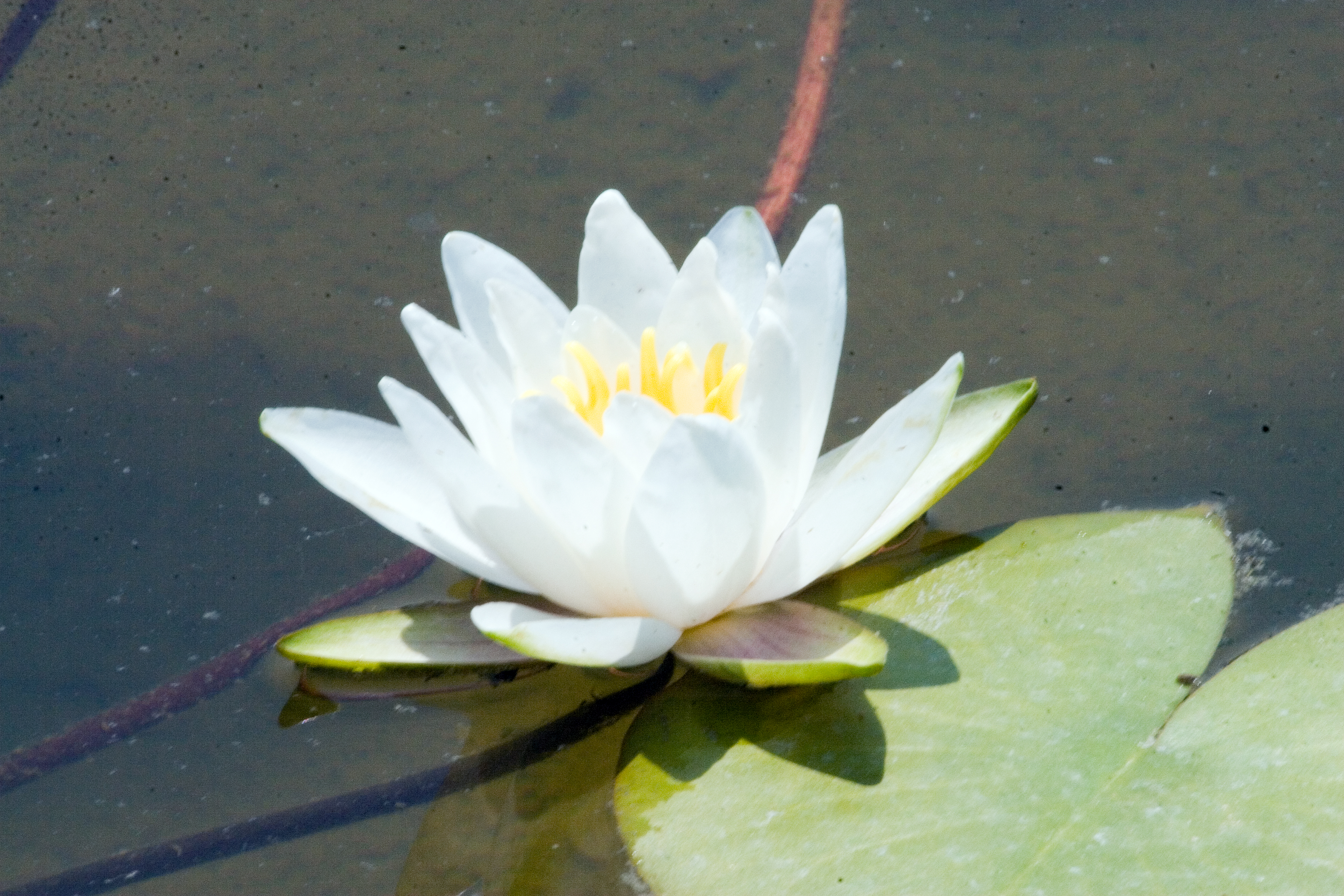
Nymphaea × marliacea 'Albida' with a white flower

Putative parent species of
Nymphaea × marliacea
Lat.-Marl.

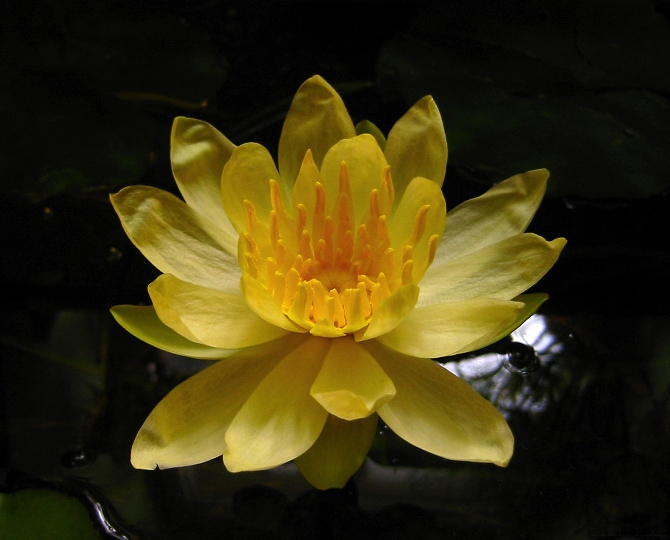
Nymphaea mexicana Zucc.

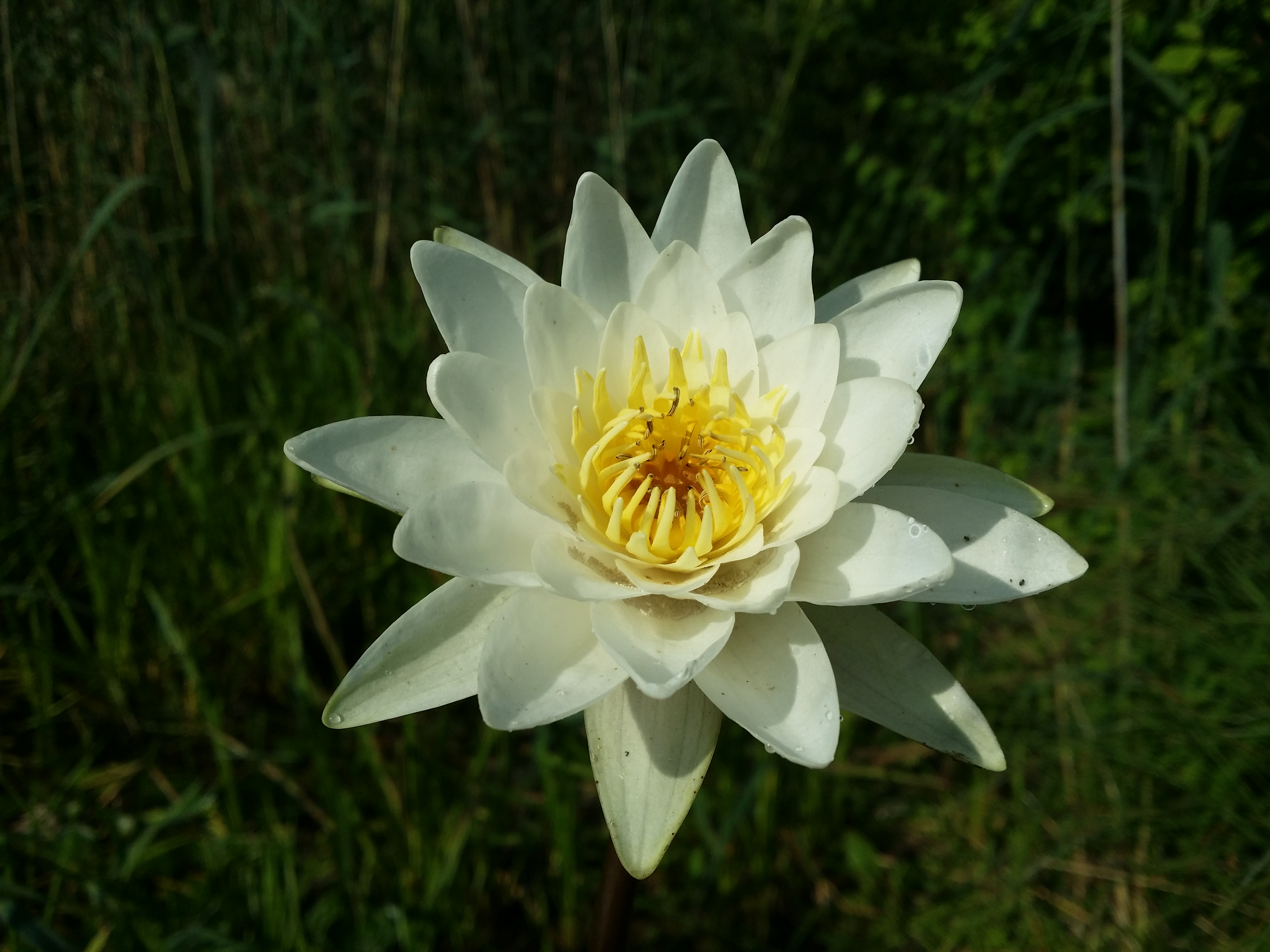
Nymphaea alba L.

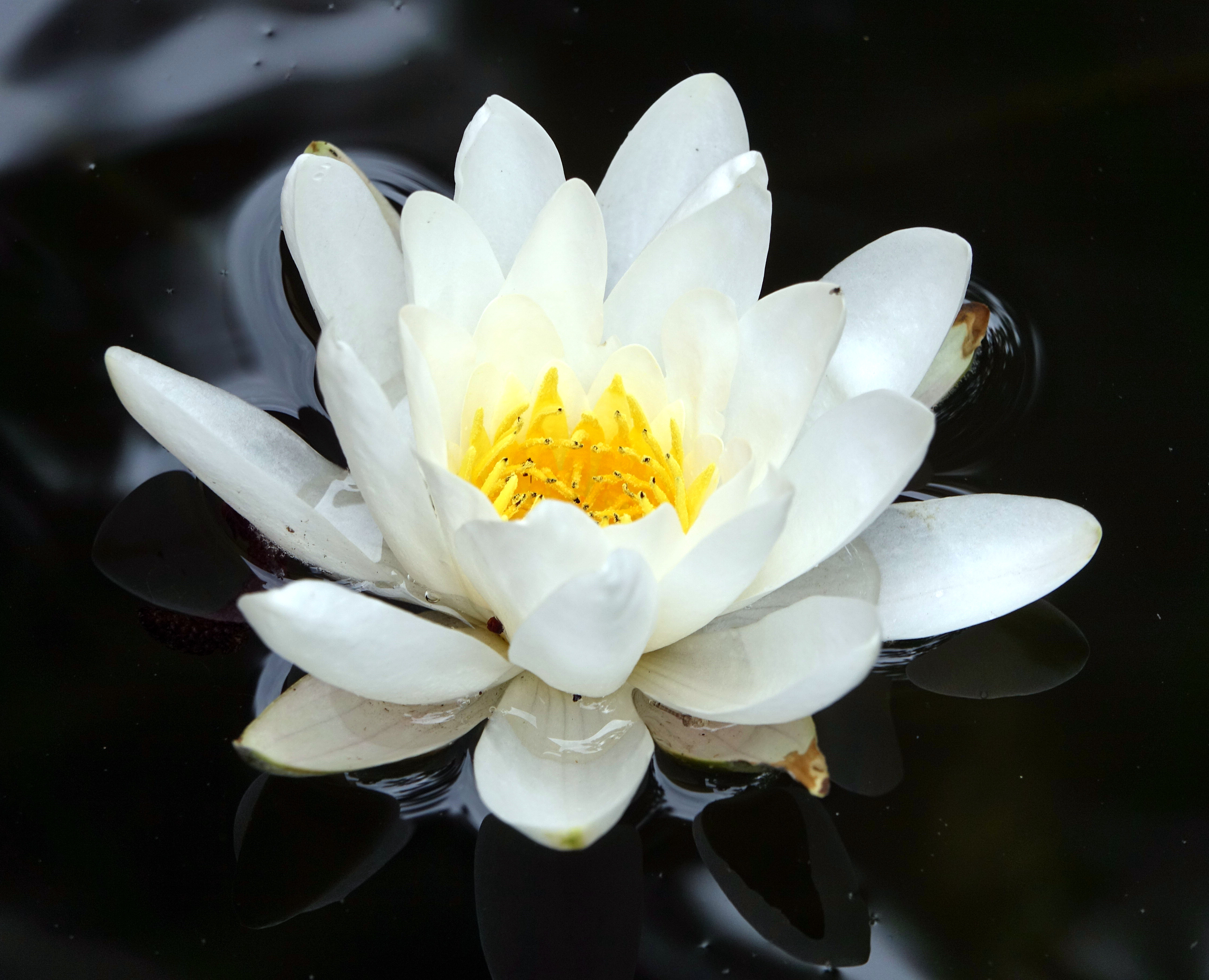
Nymphaea odorata Aiton

=== Vegetative characteristics ===
Nymphaea × marliacea is a perennial, aquatic, rhizomatous, herb with large, branching, stoloniferous, horizontal, 35 mm wide rhizomes. The glabrous, suborbicular floating leaf with a deep basal sinus is up to 20 cm wide. The leaves can extend beyond the water surface under crowded conditions. The upper leaf surface shows a reddish brown marbled pattern, and the lower leaf surface displays purple spotting. The glabrous petiole reaches lengths of over 1 m. It can reproduce vegetatively through stolons.

=== Generative characteristics ===
The large, often fragrant, diurnal, white, or faintly pink or yellow, up to 20 cm wide flowers float on the water surface or extend beyond it. The peduncle may reach lengths over 1 m. The flower has four sepals. The androecium consists of 50 stamens. Flowering occurs from May to October. It is a (generally) sterile hybrid.

== Taxonomy ==
It was described by Joseph Bory Latour-Marliac in 1888. The taxon authority appears to be disputed. Some sources give Joseph Bory Latour-Marliac as the taxon author, while others give William Wildsmith, or William Watson as the taxon author. However, W. Watson credited Joseph Bory Latour-Marliac with the name and its description, and therefore the name should be assigned to Latour-Marliac. Nymphaea × marliacea has not been typified. It is placed in the subgenus Nymphaea subg. Nymphaea.

=== Etymology ===
The hybrid name marliacea refers to the French horticulturist Joseph Bory Latour-Marliac (1830-1911).

=== Hybridisation ===
A genetic analysis indicates it is closer to Nymphaea alba than to Nymphaea odorata. A genetic analysis of ISSR data suggests that Nymphaea × marliacea, together with Nymphaea alba, forms a separate group from Nymphaea mexicana, Nymphaea odorata, and Nymphaea tetragona. The Nymphaea × marliacea-group is subdivided into two subgroups: Nymphaea × marliacea 'Chromatella' and Nymphaea × marliacea 'Albida' together with Nymphaea alba.

== Distribution and habitat ==
It has been introduced to Australia, the United Kingdom, Italy, Spain, Hungary, Malta, Canada, the USA, and New Zealand. It has been found growing in ponds, lakes, and canals.

== Ecology ==
It is a host plant to the phytopathogenic fungus Rhamphospora nymphaeae.

=== Invasiveness ===
In Victoria, Australia it is regarded as somewhat invasive and it shows a slow dispersal rate. Naturalised Nymphaea × marliacea plants grow vigorously and can cover almost the entire surface of ponds. The naturalised plants appear to be planted deliberately and may not be able to disperse by themselves. Small populations may be eradicated through the removal of the rhizomes, but larger populations may require repeated mowing with specialised boats.

== Cultivation ==
It is one of the most commonly cultivated hybrids. It is a cold-hardy plant with vigorous growth. It grows well in 0.5–1.5 m deep ponds.
