= Peperomia caperata =

Scientific classification
- Kingdom: Plantae
- Clade: Tracheophytes
- Clade: Angiosperms
- Clade: Magnoliids
- Order: Piperales
- Family: Piperaceae
- Genus: Peperomia
- Species: P. caperata

Binomial name
- Peperomia caperata Yunck.

Species of flowering plant

Peperomia caperata, the emerald ripple peperomia, is a species of flowering plant in the family Piperaceae, native to Brazil. It is a mound-forming evergreen perennial growing to 20 cm (8 in) tall and wide, with corrugated heart-shaped leaves, and narrow spikes of white flowers 5–8 cm (2–3 in) long, in summer.

With a minimum temperature requirement of 15 °C (59 °F), P. caperata must be grown indoors in most temperate regions.

== Cultivars ==
Peperomia caperata is a popular houseplant. Numerous cultivars have been developed, of which 'Luna Red' has gained the Royal Horticultural Society's Award of Garden Merit.

=== Gallery ===
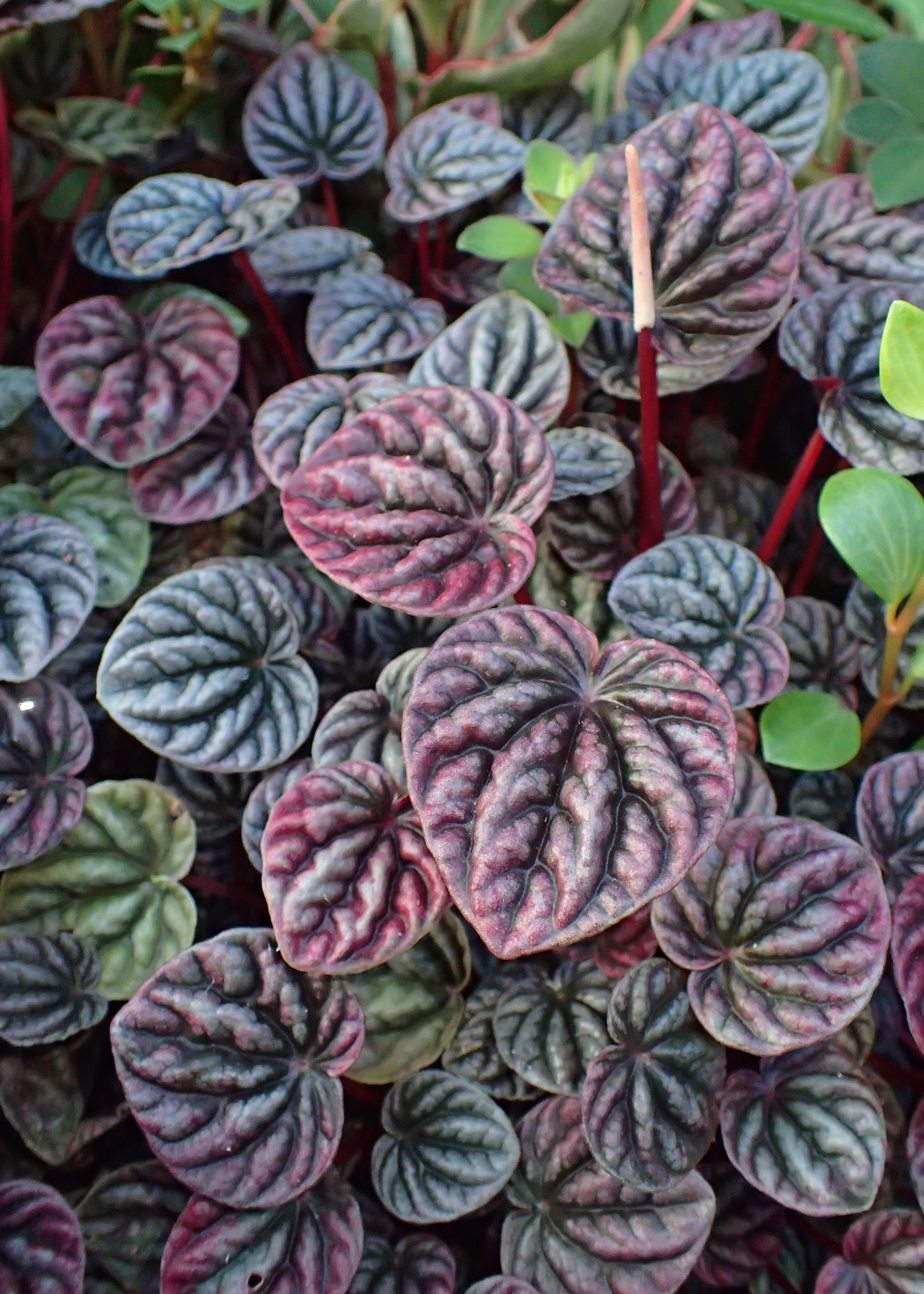
P.c. 'Red ripple' in Bydgoszcz, Poland

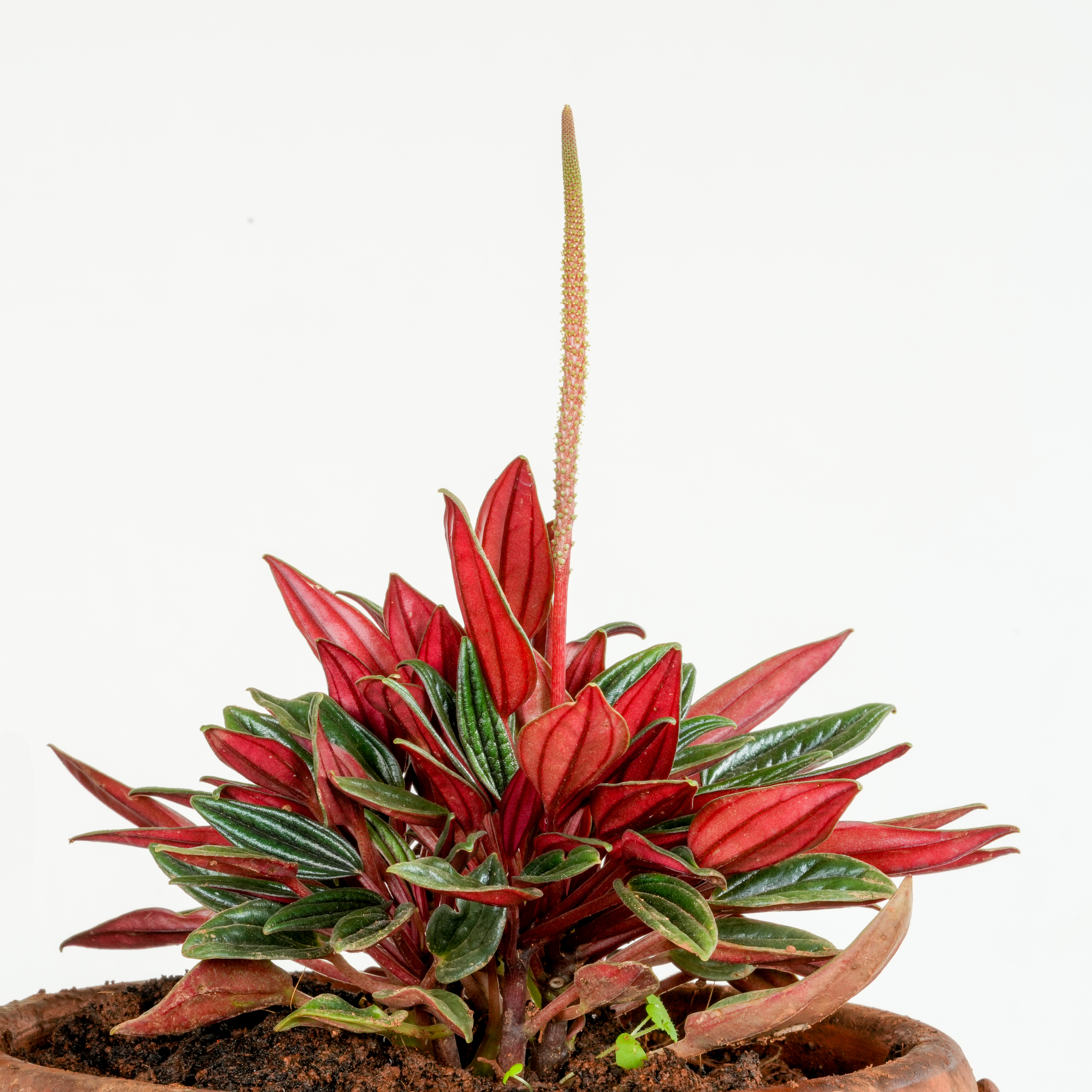
P.c. 'Rosso' in Ooty, India

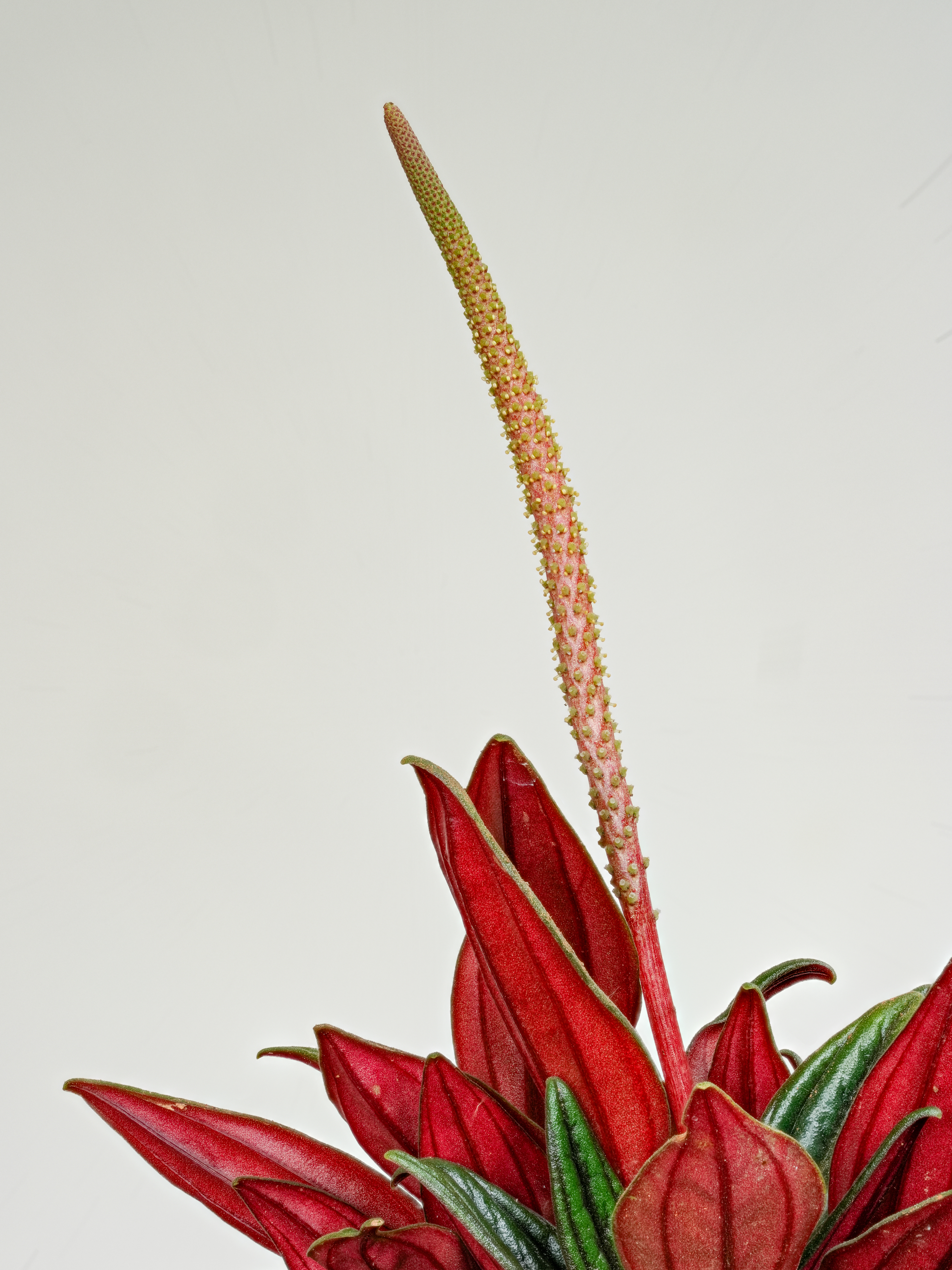
Tiny flowers (~1 mm (0.039 in)) on spike of P.c. 'Rosso'

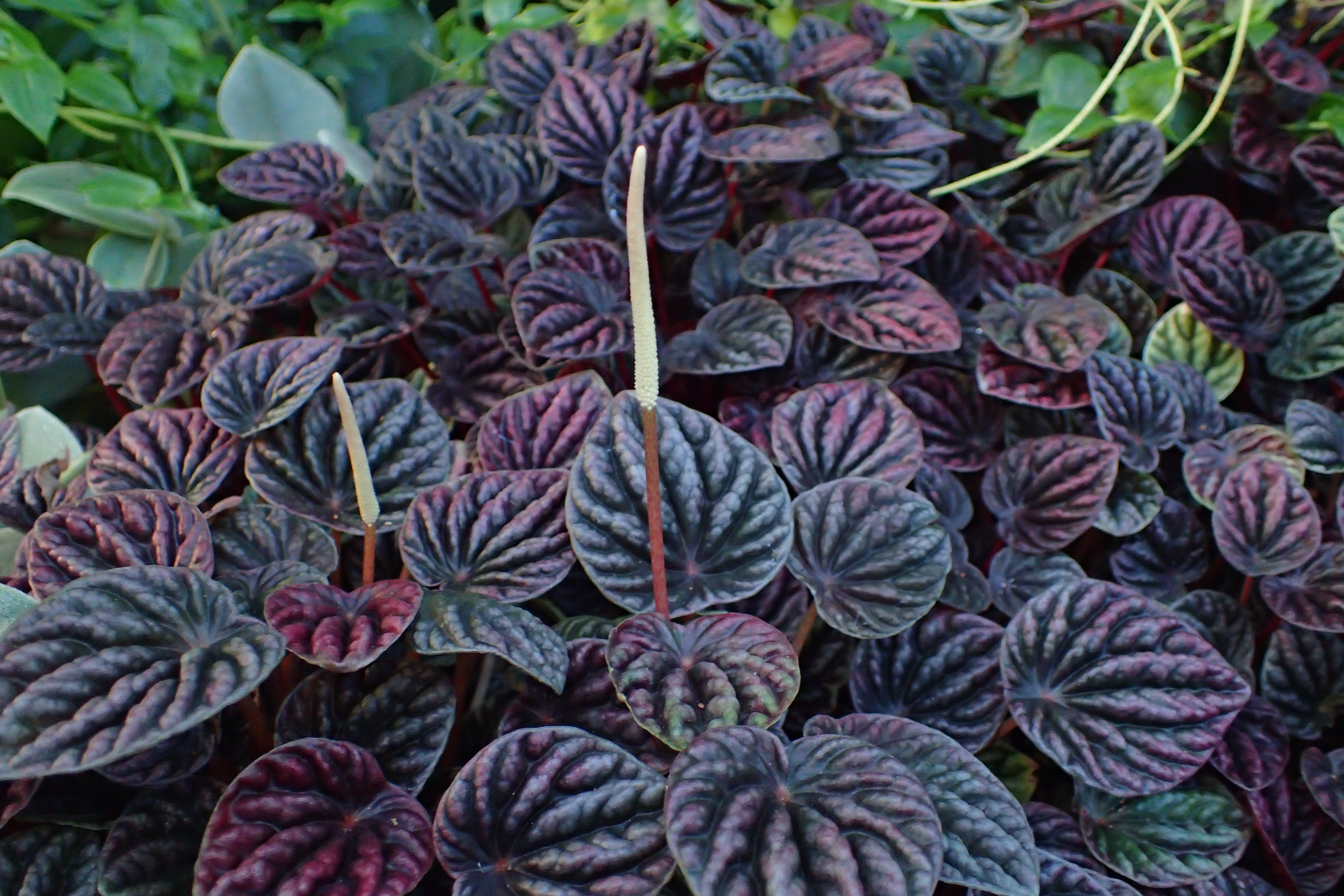
P.c. 'Rubra' in Bydgoszcz, Poland
