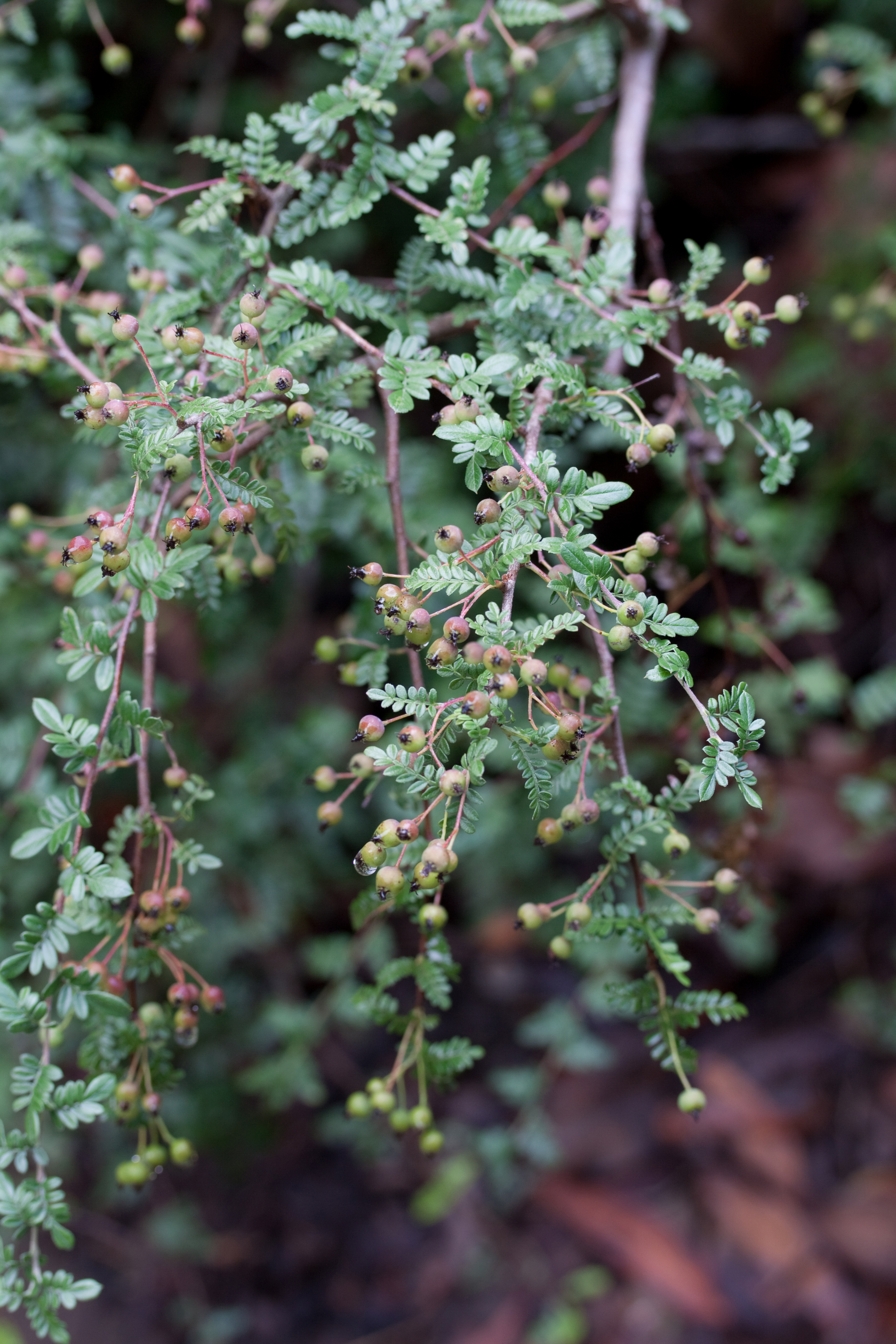
- plant with young fruit

Scientific classification
- Kingdom: Plantae
- Clade: Tracheophytes
- Clade: Angiosperms
- Clade: Eudicots
- Clade: Rosids
- Order: Rosales
- Family: Rosaceae
- Genus: Osteomeles
- Species: O. schwerinae

Binomial name
- Osteomeles schwerinae C.K.Schneid.

= Osteomeles schwerinae =

Species of flowering plant

Osteomeles schwerinae is a species of plant native to China. Its flowers are white and resemble those of hawthorn species. It produces small, white, round berries that are pomes. The fruit is edible, sweet and can be eaten raw or used to make jellies and jams. The plant is grown in gardens as an ornamental and is also used in bonsai. O. schwerinae can be found in mainland China and Taiwan.
