= Joseph Bory Latour-Marliac =

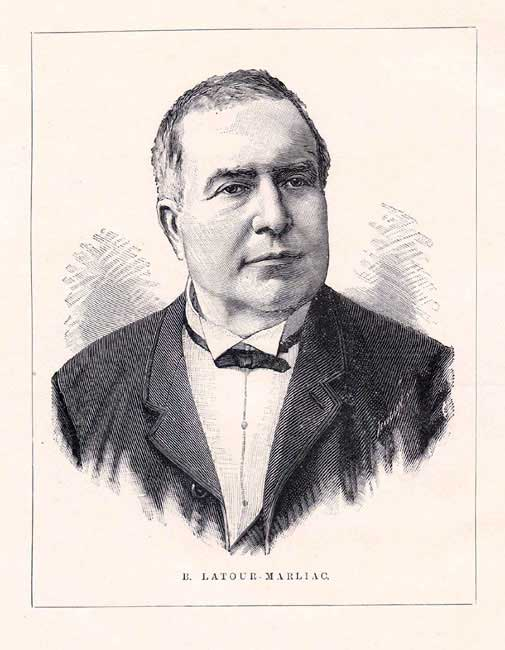
- Drawing of Joseph Bory Latour-Marliac published in 1893.
- Born: 6 March 1830; Granges-sur-Lot, Lot-et-Garonne, France
- Died: 26 January 1911 (aged 80)
- Occupations: lawyer and horticulturist
- Known for: water lily hybrids

Joseph Bory Latour-Marliac (6 March 1830 in Granges-sur-Lot, Lot-et-Garonne - 26 January 1911, botanical author abbreviation: Lat.-Marl.) was a French lawyer and horticulturalist noted for breeding water lily hybrids. Latour-Marliac founded a water lily nursery at Le Temple-sur-Lot in 1875. A display of his plants at the Exposition Universelle of 1889 in Paris attracted the attention of the painter Claude Monet who then obtained water lilies for his garden in Giverny from Latour-Marliac.
