= Begonia fusca =

Scientific classification
- Kingdom: Plantae
- Clade: Tracheophytes
- Clade: Angiosperms
- Clade: Eudicots
- Clade: Rosids
- Order: Cucurbitales
- Family: Begoniaceae
- Genus: Begonia
- Species: B. fusca

Binomial name
- Begonia fusca Liebm.

Synonyms
- Begonia maxima (Klotzsch) A.DC.; Magnusia fusca (Liebm.) Klotzsch; Magnusia maxima Klotzsch

Species of plant

Begonia fusca is a species of flowering plant in the family Begoniaceae, native to central and southern Mexico, Guatemala, and Honduras. A large rhizomatous species, its leaves can be 67 cm (26 in) long by 54 cm (21 in) wide, mounted on 80 cm (31 in) petioles.
