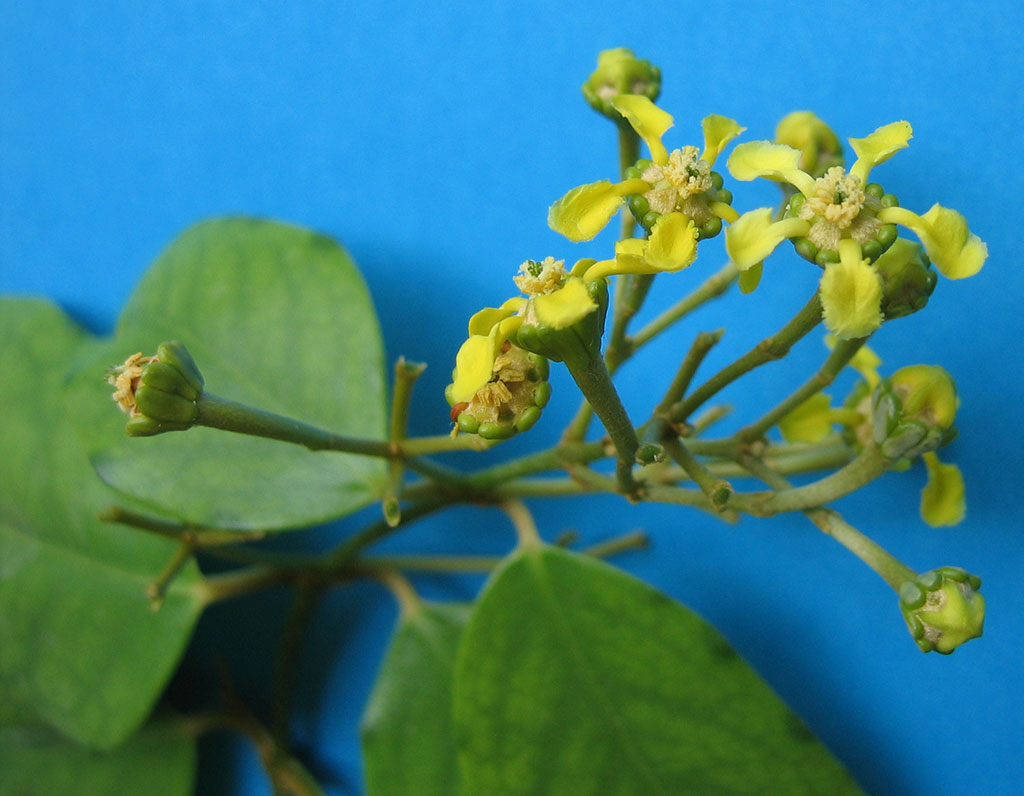

Scientific classification
- Kingdom: Plantae
- Clade: Tracheophytes
- Clade: Angiosperms
- Clade: Eudicots
- Clade: Rosids
- Order: Malpighiales
- Family: Malpighiaceae
- Genus: Heteropterys
- Species: H. chrysophylla

Binomial name
- Heteropterys chrysophylla (Lam.) Kunth

Synonyms
- Banisteria chrysophylla Lam.

= Heteropterys chrysophylla =

Species of flowering plant

Heteropterys chrysophylla is a species of flowering plant that grows in South America and can be found from Brazil to Argentina.
