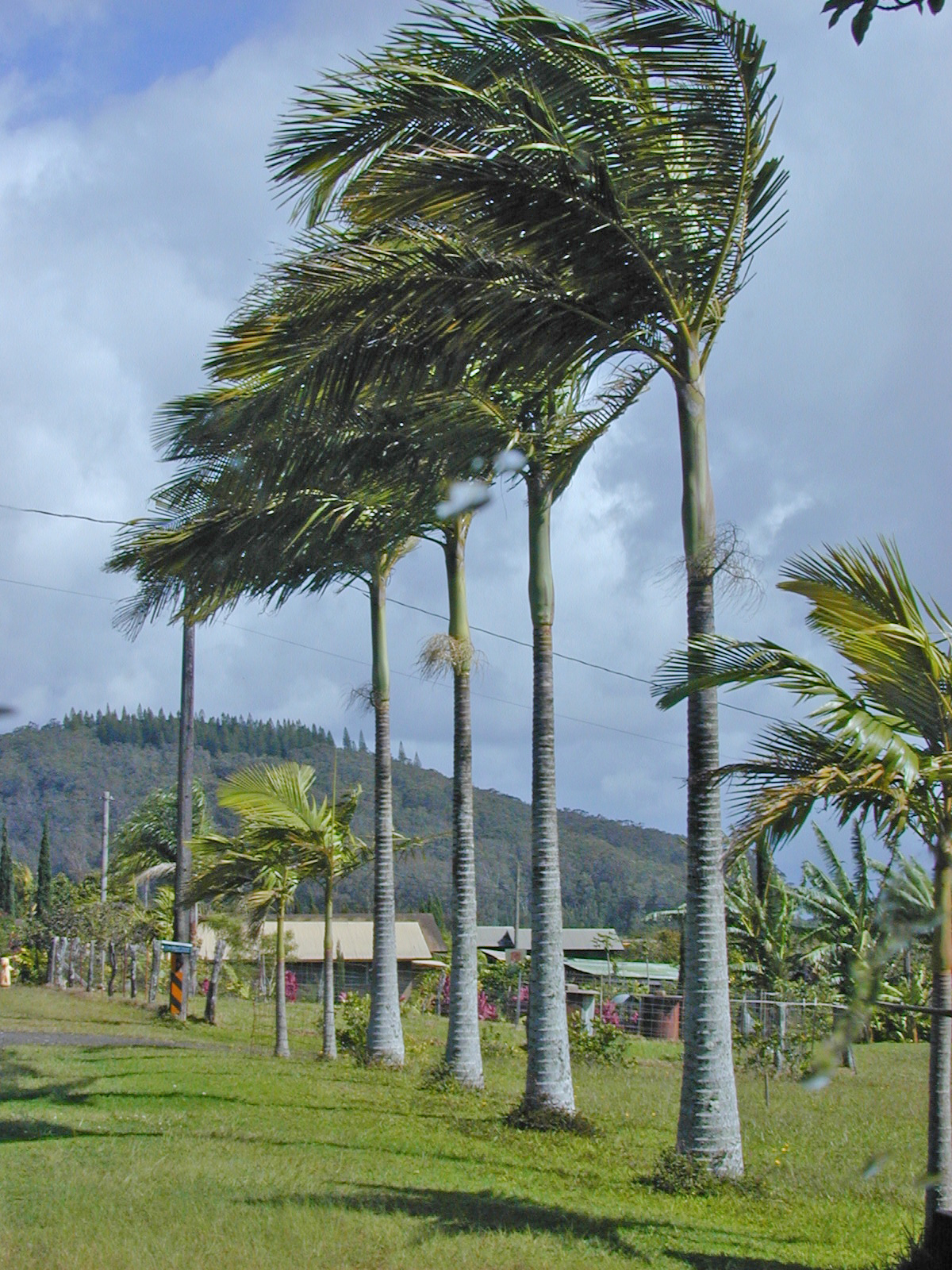
- Archontophoenix alexandrae

Scientific classification
- Kingdom: Plantae
- Clade: Tracheophytes
- Clade: Angiosperms
- Clade: Monocots
- Clade: Commelinids
- Order: Arecales
- Family: Arecaceae
- Subfamily: Arecoideae
- Tribe: Areceae
- Subtribe: Archontophoenicinae
- Genus: Archontophoenix; H.Wendl. & Drude

Synonyms
- Loroma O.F.Cook

= Archontophoenix =

Genus of palms

Archontophoenix is a plant genus comprising six palm species that are native to New South Wales and Queensland in eastern Australia. They are tall, slender and unbranched. Relationships between Archontophoenix and the other genera of subtribe Archontophoenicinae, including the New Caledonia endemic Actinokentia, Chambeyronia and Kentiopsis are unresolved.

Species include:

- Archontophoenix alexandrae (F.Muell.) H.Wendl. & Drude - Alexandra palm, king palm
- Archontophoenix cunninghamiana H.Wendl. & Drude - Bangalow palm, piccabeen palm
- Archontophoenix maxima Dowe
- Archontophoenix myolensis Dowe
- Archontophoenix purpurea Hodel & Dowe - Mount Lewis king palm
- Archontophoenix tuckeri Dowe

== Etymology ==
The genus name is derived from the Ancient Greek ἄρχων (árkhōn), meaning 'chieftain' or 'ruler', combined with the palm genus Phoenix, and refers to the regal stature of these trees.

== Classification ==
Subfamily: Arecoideae; Tribe: Areceae; Subtribe: Archontophoenicinae. There are four other genera in the subtribe Archontophoenicinae, namely Actinokentia, Actinorhytis, Chambeyronia, Kentiopsis.
