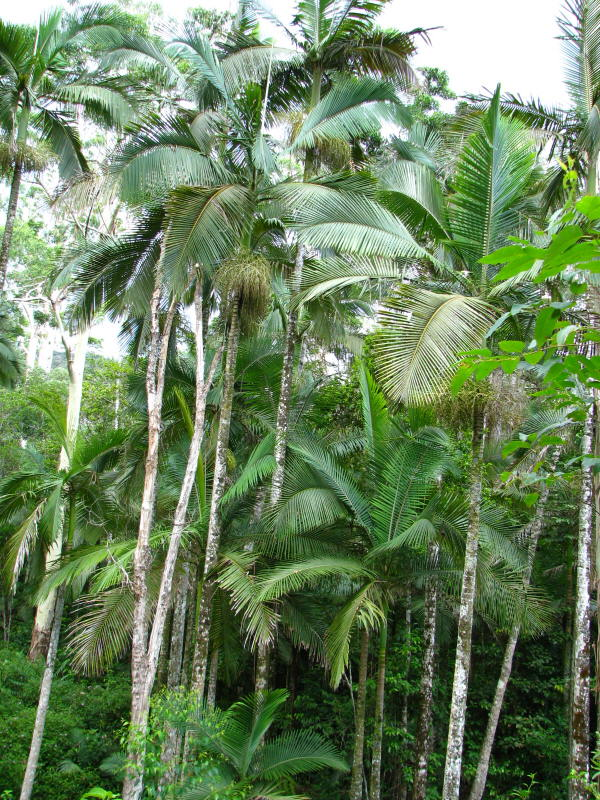

Conservation status
- Least Concern (NCA)

Scientific classification
- Kingdom: Plantae
- Clade: Tracheophytes
- Clade: Angiosperms
- Clade: Monocots
- Clade: Commelinids
- Order: Arecales
- Family: Arecaceae
- Genus: Archontophoenix
- Species: A. maxima

Binomial name
- Archontophoenix maxima Dowe

= Archontophoenix maxima =

Walsh River palm

Species of palm

Archontophoenix maxima, commonly known as the Walsh River palm or Oaky Creek Archontophoenix, is a large tree of the palm family Arecaceae. It is endemic to Queensland, Australia, and was first described in 1992.

== Description ==
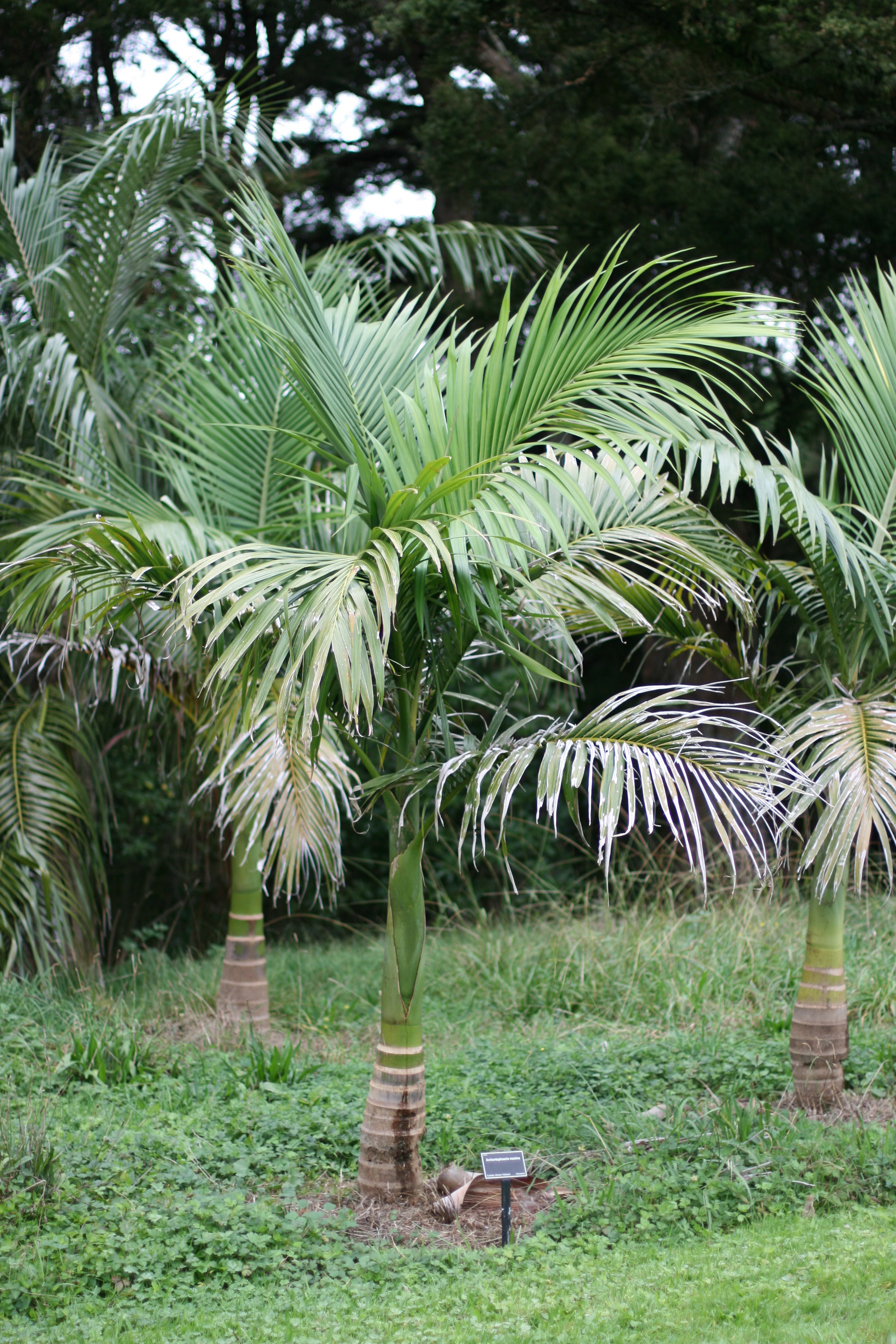
Juvenile A. maxima

The Walsh River palm grows up to 22 m (70 ft) tall; the trunk is up to 30 cm (12 in) and has an expanded base. The erect to horizontal fronds are up to 4 m (13 ft) long, and are slightly rotated around the long axis. The massive branched inflorescence is up to 1.5 m (5 ft) long and bears white flowers. When ripe, the fruit is red and 13–15 mm (0.5–0.6 in) in length. The flowers closely resemble those of A. alexandrae.

== Distribution and habitat ==
This robust palm grows in rainforest at altitudes between 800 and 1,200 m (2,600 and 3,900 ft) on the Walsh River and the adjacent Mount Haig Range in the Atherton Tableland at approximately 17° S latitude.
