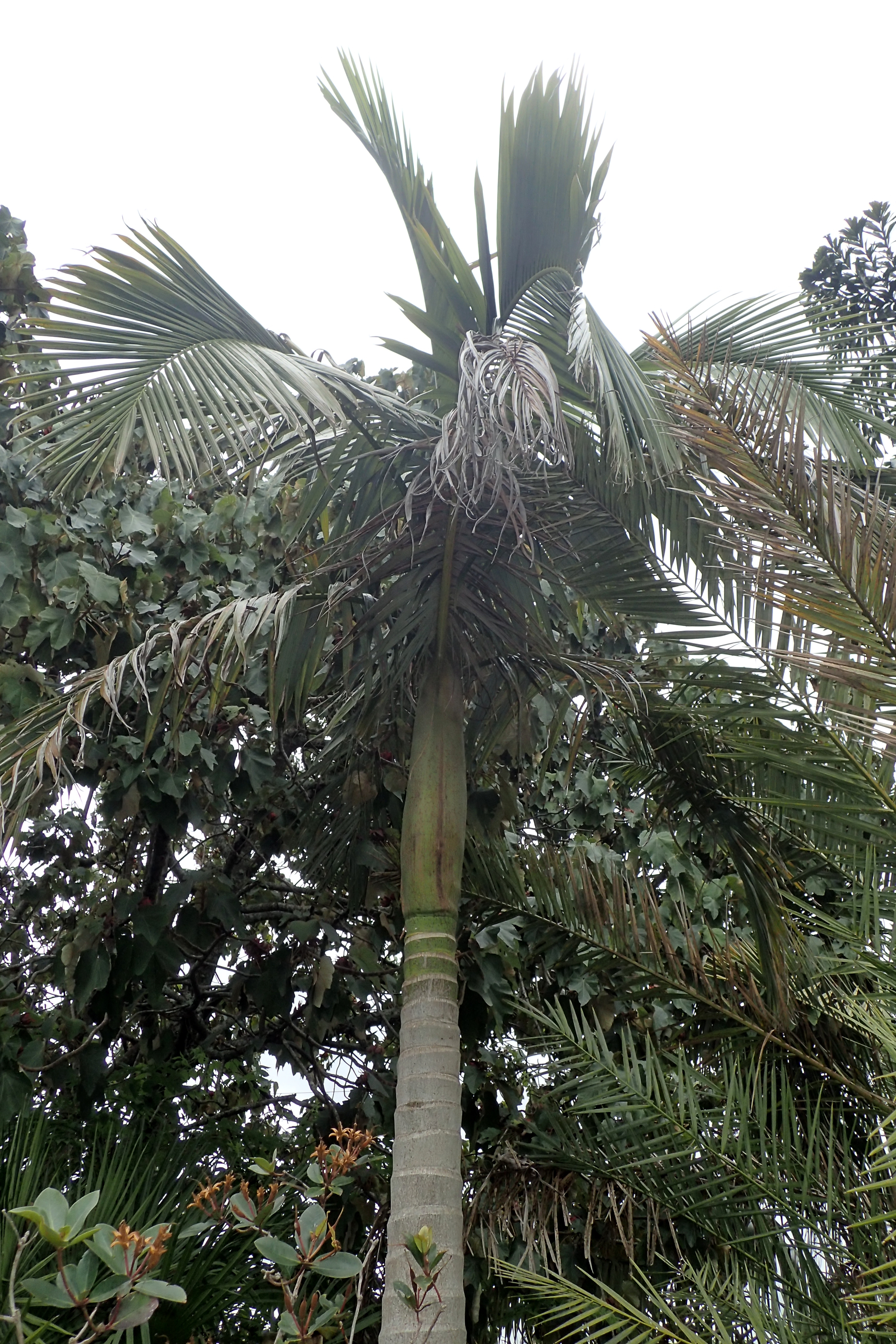

Scientific classification
- Kingdom: Plantae
- Clade: Tracheophytes
- Clade: Angiosperms
- Clade: Monocots
- Clade: Commelinids
- Order: Arecales
- Family: Arecaceae
- Genus: Archontophoenix
- Species: A. tuckeri

Binomial name
- Archontophoenix tuckeri Dowe

= Archontophoenix tuckeri =

Species of palm

Archontophoenix tuckeri, the Rocky River palm or Cape York palm, is a palm native to Australia.

== Description ==
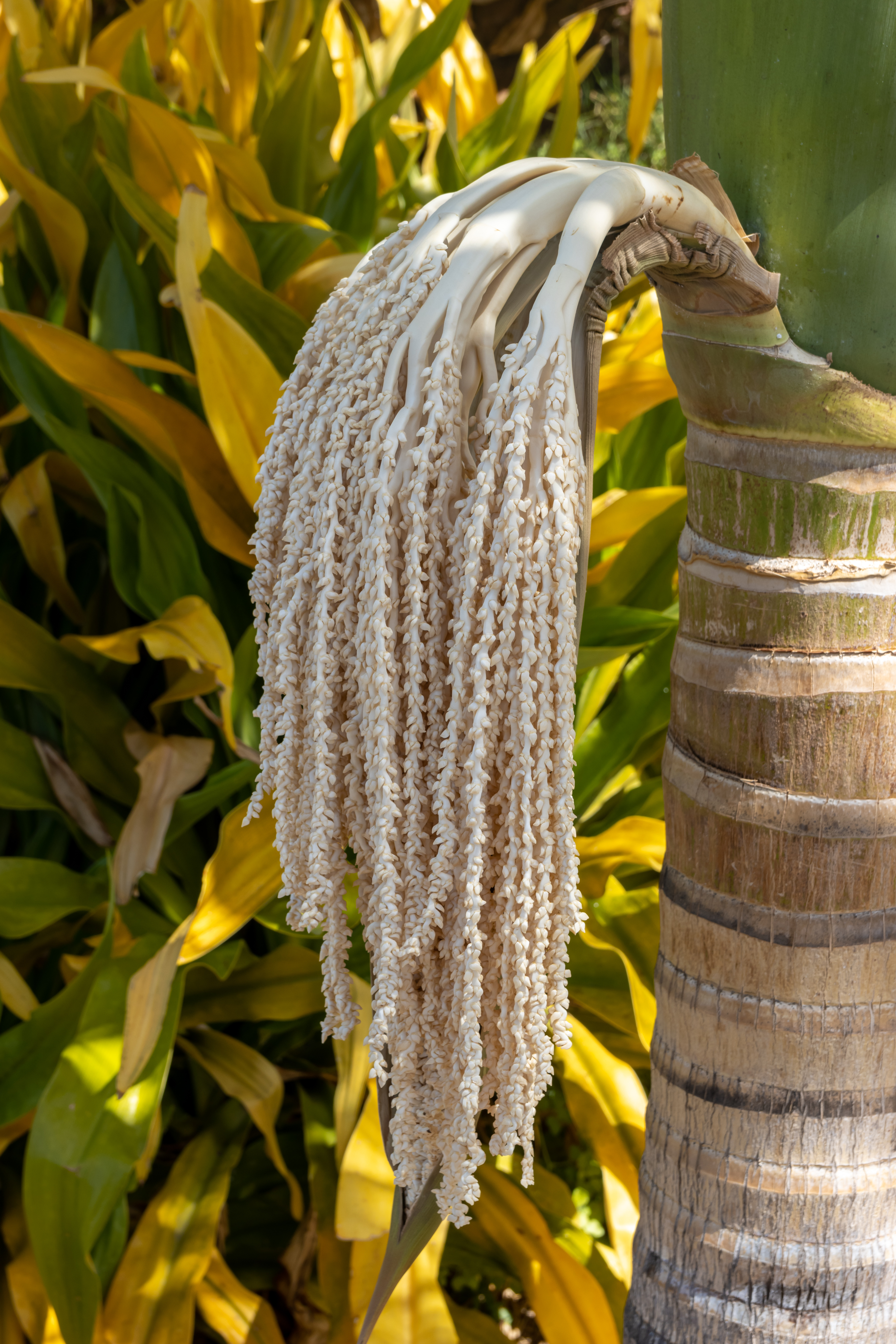
Fruiting

Palm to 20 m tall, trunk to 26 cm in diameter and expanded at the base. Leaves about 3 m long with a moderate lateral twist. Crownshaft is green. Pinnae have silver/grey scales below and tend to be semi-pendulous in the apical 1/3. They lack ramenta on the midrib below. The inflorescence, branched to 3 orders, usually holds the branches erect though they become pendulous in fruit; it is usually wider than long and remains green with maturation of the fruit. Flowers are white/cream. Staminate flower has 13-19 stamens. Fruit is red/brick-red at maturity, 17–25 mm long. Fibres in the mesocarp are in two distinct layers, the outer with thin straight fibres, the inner with thick, fiat to 0.3 mm wide, usually held tight in the dried state.

It occurs in rainforest, gallery forest, swampforest, mangrove ecotone and moist vine-thickets of Cape York Peninsula, Queensland from Mcllwraith Range [14° 00'S] to Cape York [10° 40'S], from sea-level to 500 m altitude.

This is a variable species which tends to become shorter with smaller leaves in the northern parts of its range. The fruit is large and the two distinct layers of fibres in the mesocarp are unique within the genus. New leaves are often in tones of pink, red or bronze, and the juvenile leaves become proportionately larger than in other species before they commence to divide.
