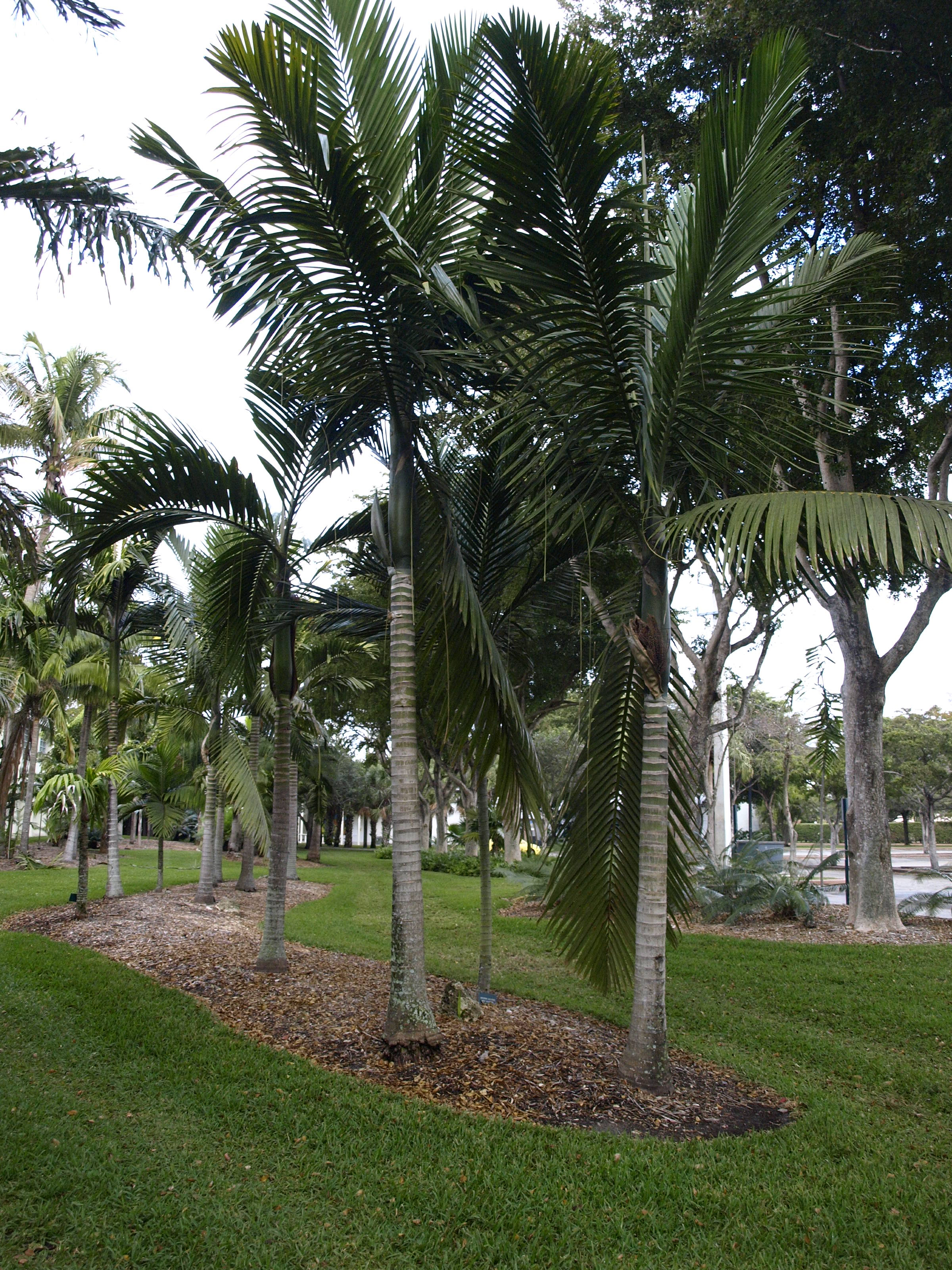

Conservation status
- Endangered (IUCN 3.1)

Scientific classification
- Kingdom: Plantae
- Clade: Tracheophytes
- Clade: Angiosperms
- Clade: Monocots
- Clade: Commelinids
- Order: Arecales
- Family: Arecaceae
- Genus: Chambeyronia
- Species: C. oliviformis

Binomial name
- Chambeyronia oliviformis (Brongn. & Gris) Hodel & C.F.Barrett

Synonyms
- Kentia oliviformis Brongn. & Gris; Kentiopsis oliviformis (Brongn. & Gris) Brongn.

= Chambeyronia oliviformis =

Species of palm

Chambeyronia oliviformis is a species of flowering plant in the family Arecaceae. It is a palm tree endemic to New Caledonia.

The species was first described as Kentia oliviformis by Adolphe-Théodore Brongniart and Jean Antoine Arthur Gris in 1873. The same year Brongniart described the genus Kentiopsis and moved the species there as Kentiopsis oliviformis. In 2021 Donald R. Hodel and Craig F. Barrett synonymized Kentiopsis with genus Chambeyronia, and renamed the species Chambeyronia oliviformis.
