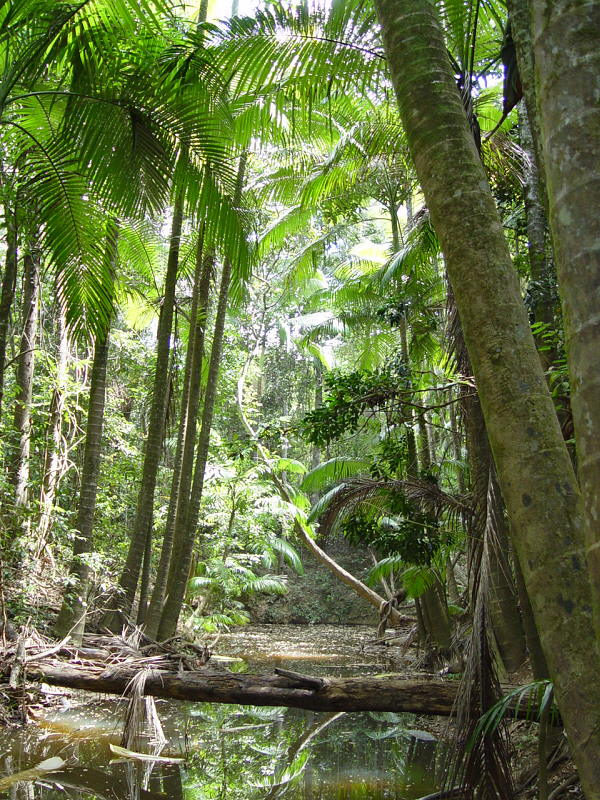

Conservation status
- Vulnerable (IUCN 2.3)

Scientific classification
- Kingdom: Plantae
- Clade: Tracheophytes
- Clade: Angiosperms
- Clade: Monocots
- Clade: Commelinids
- Order: Arecales
- Family: Arecaceae
- Genus: Archontophoenix
- Species: A. myolensis

Binomial name
- Archontophoenix myolensis Dowe

= Archontophoenix myolensis =

Myola palm

Species of palm

Archontophoenix myolensis, the Myola palm, is a species of flowering plant in the family Arecaceae. It is endemic to Queensland, Australia.

== Description ==
Archontophoenix myolensis is a palm growing to 20 metres tall. The trunk is 30 cms in diameter at breast height, expanding to 50 cms at the base. The trunk is green to grey in colour and smooth, becoming fissured with age. There are 9-12 leaves in the crown, reaching 4 metres long. Each leaf is divided into 68-71 leaflets arising from each side of the 3.8 metre stalk. The leathery leaflets are up to 1.1 metres long and 6.5 cms wide, dark green above and have dense silver-grey scales below.

The flowering stalks are 50-157 cms long and up to 60 cms wide, light cream to light green in colour with flowers white/cream. The fruit is an elongate cone to egg shaped, 13-21 mms long and 10-20 mms in diameter. The mature fruit is red and has a waxy coating. The seeds are an elongated egg-shape, 14-20 mms long by 8-9.5 mms wide and are dull, light brown in colour.

Archontophoenix myolensis flowers between May and July. Mature fruit has been recorded from December to March.

== Distribution ==
Archontophoenix myolensis is known to occur only in the Myola area, near Kuranda on the Atherton Tableland in north-eastern Queensland. It occurs in riverine rainforest at 350-400 metres in altitude on metamorphic rock.

== Conservation ==
The Myola Palm is listed as vulnerable by the IUCN and as endangered by the Queensland Government.
