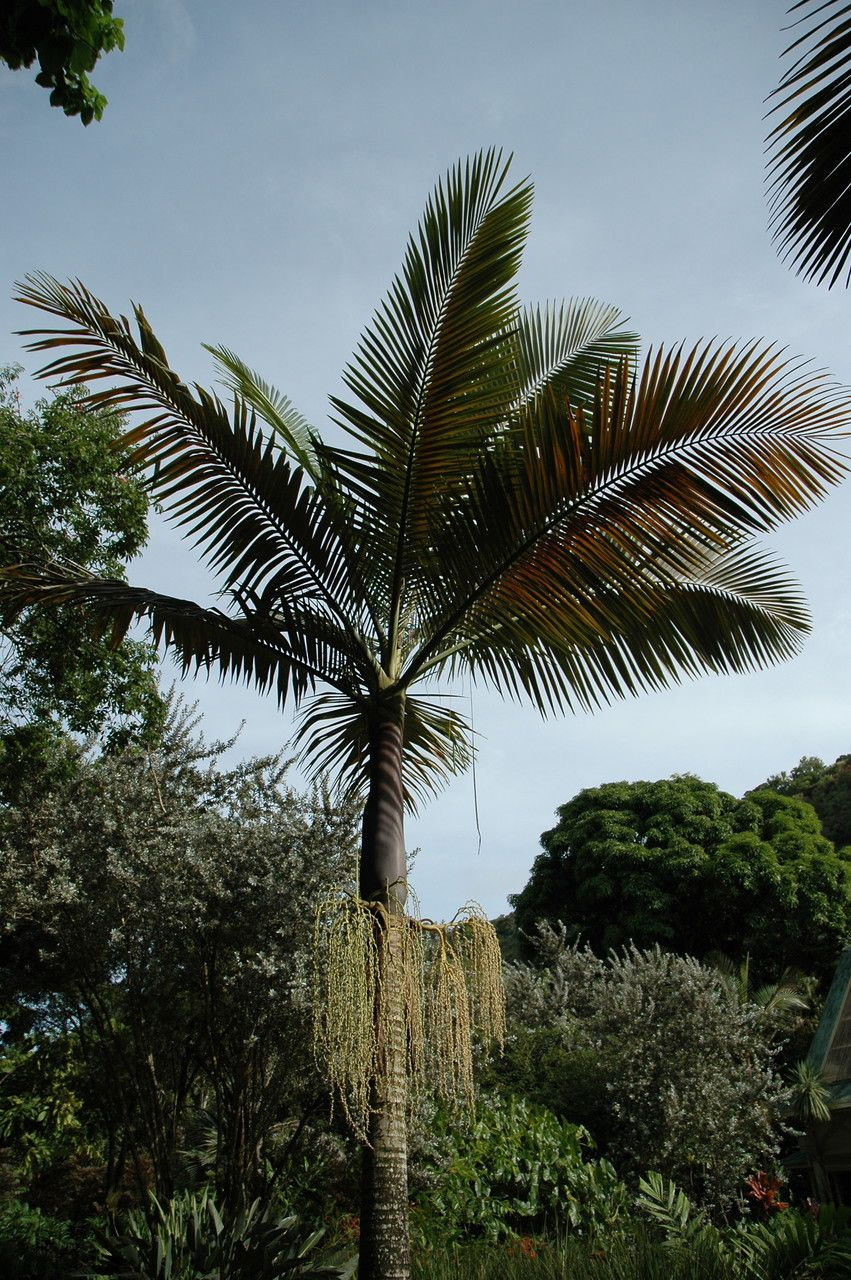

Conservation status
- Least Concern (NCA)

Scientific classification
- Kingdom: Plantae
- Clade: Tracheophytes
- Clade: Angiosperms
- Clade: Monocots
- Clade: Commelinids
- Order: Arecales
- Family: Arecaceae
- Genus: Archontophoenix
- Species: A. purpurea

Binomial name
- Archontophoenix purpurea Hodel & Dowe, 1994

= Archontophoenix purpurea =

Species of palm

Archontophoenix purpurea is a palm tree native to Queensland, Australia.

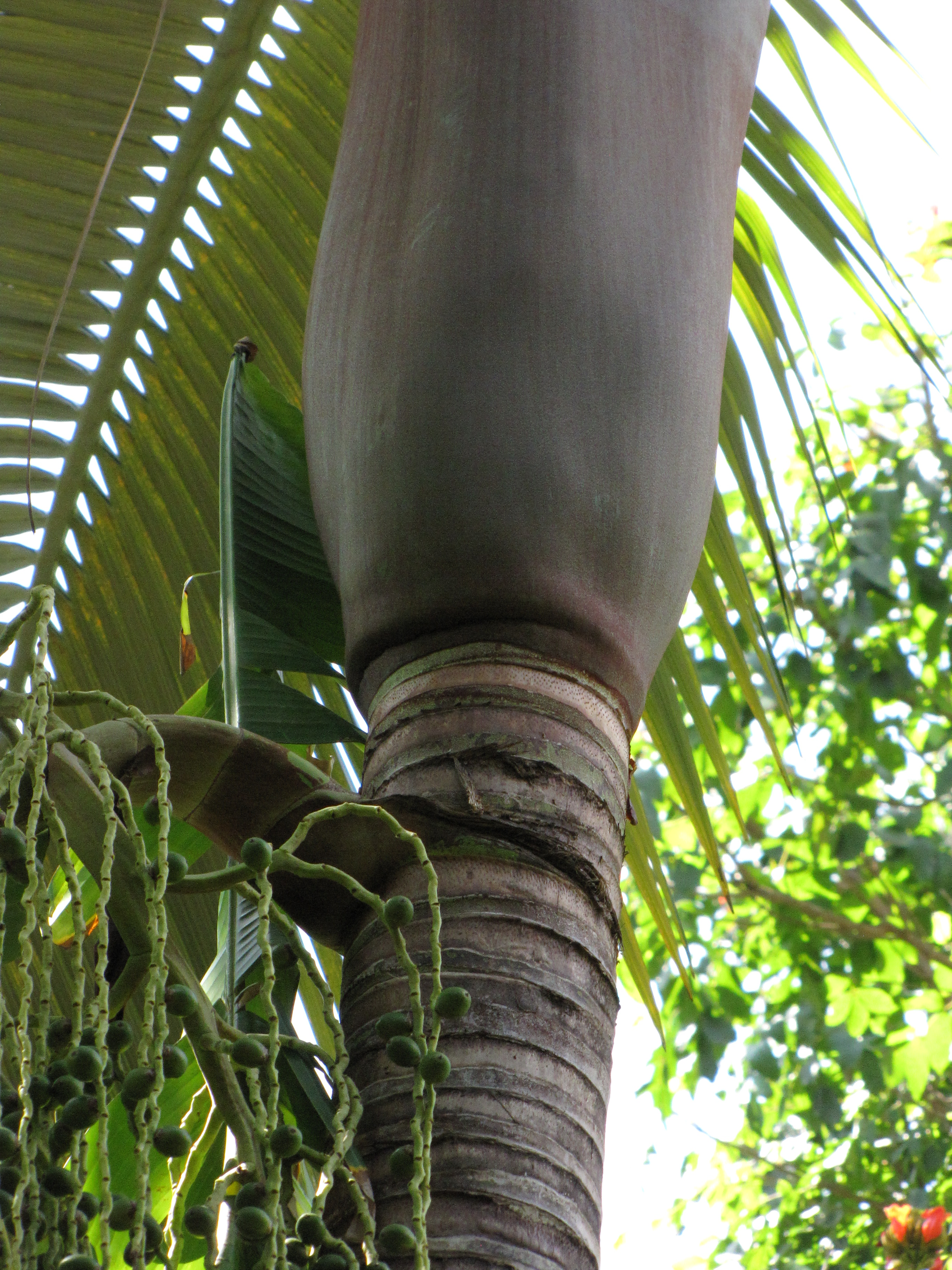
Purple Crownshaft & Inflorescence of Archontophoenix purpurea

== Habitat and distribution ==
This species is endemic to Northeast Queensland, and can be found on or near the mountains Finnigan, Spurgeon and Lewis in the Wet Tropics. It grows on granitic soils in the rainforest at altitudes of 400 to 1200 metres.

== Description ==
It grows to a height of 25 metres tall, with the diameter of the trunk being up to 45 centimetres. Leaves can grow up to 6 m long, becoming obliquely orientated with leaf sheath coloured green to purple. Pinnae are 55–85 each side of rachis, and are up to 105 cm long. They are dark green adaxially and silver-grey abaxially with ramenta present. Inflorescence can be up to 135 cms long and can be branched to 4 orders. The axes are green; rachillae grow to 85 cms long, erect to semi-pendulous and are irregularly flexuose distally.

The flowers are closely spaced on the rachilla with the floral bracts raised with sharp margins and the perianth being white to cream. Staminate flower to 7 mms long; stamens to 20–35 mms; the filaments are curved and the pistillodes are about equal in length to the petals. Pistillates flower to 10 mms high. Fruit are ovoid to globose; they are 20–26 mms long, 18–22 mms wide; stigmatic remains are apical; mesocarp fibres to 2 mms wide, they are flat, sparingly branched, interspersed with terete thin fibres, remaining compact in the dried state. Seed subglobose to 23 mms long and 18 mms in diameter. Raphe fibres are strongly adherent.

It flowers from October to April and fruits from September to April.

== Conservation ==
Under the Nature Conservation Act 1992 in Queensland it has been classified as Least Concern.
