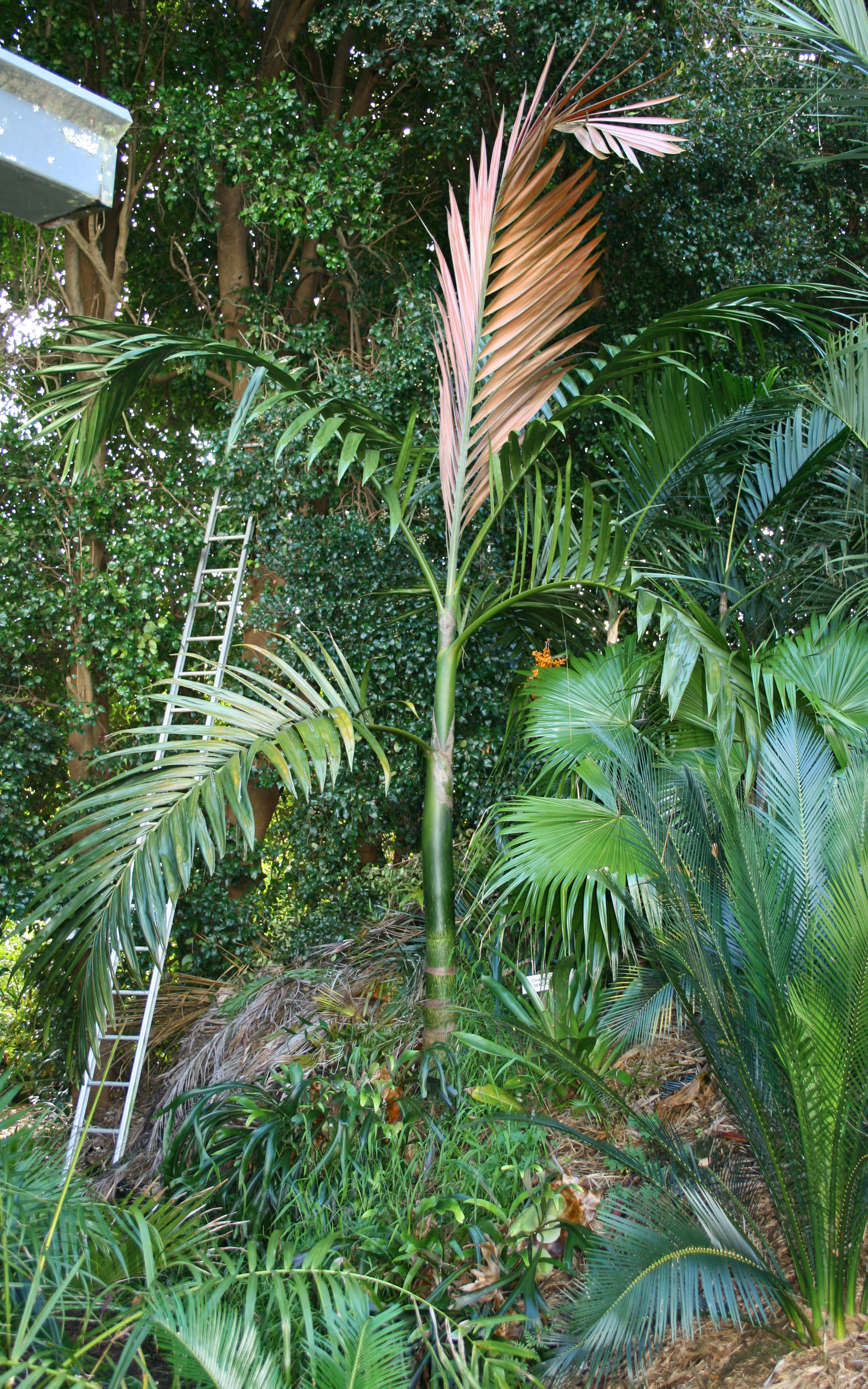

Scientific classification
- Kingdom: Plantae
- Clade: Tracheophytes
- Clade: Angiosperms
- Clade: Monocots
- Clade: Commelinids
- Order: Arecales
- Family: Arecaceae
- Genus: Chambeyronia
- Species: C. macrocarpa

Binomial name
- Chambeyronia macrocarpa (Brongn.) Vieill. ex Becc.

Synonyms
- Kentiopsis macrocarpa Brongn.; Cyphokentia macrocarpa (Brongn.) auct.; Kentia macrocarpa Vieill. ex Brongn.; Kentia rubricaulis Linden ex Salomon; Kentia lindenii Linden ex André; Kentia lucianii Linden ex Rodigas; Kentiopsis lucianii (Linden ex Rodigas) Rodigas; Chambeyronia hookeri Becc.

= Chambeyronia macrocarpa =

Red leaf palm

Species of palm

Chambeyronia macrocarpa is a species of palm tree commonly known as the red leaf palm. It is sometimes called the flamethrower palm. The species is endemic to New Caledonia.

== Gallery ==
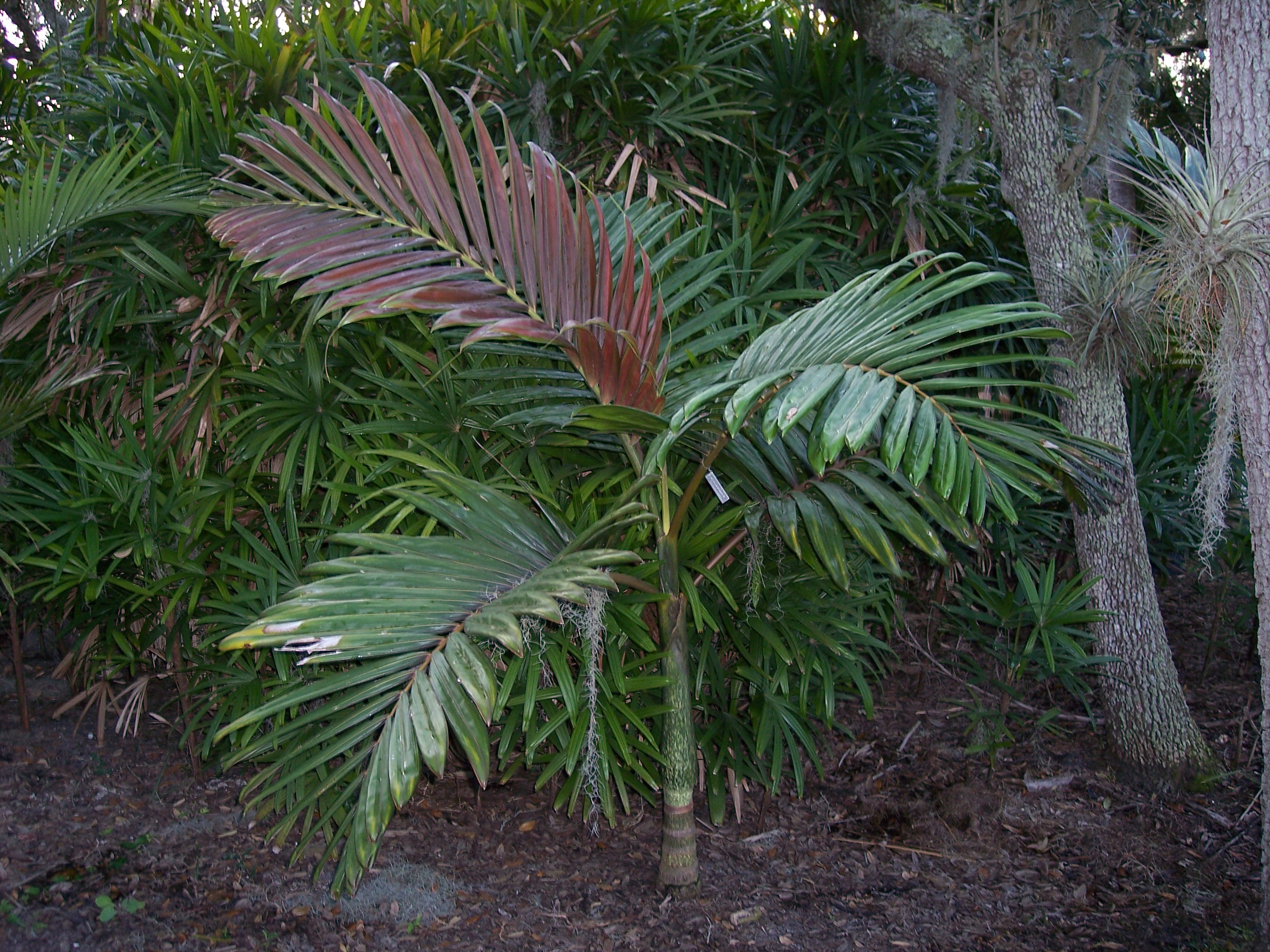
Young plant in Florida

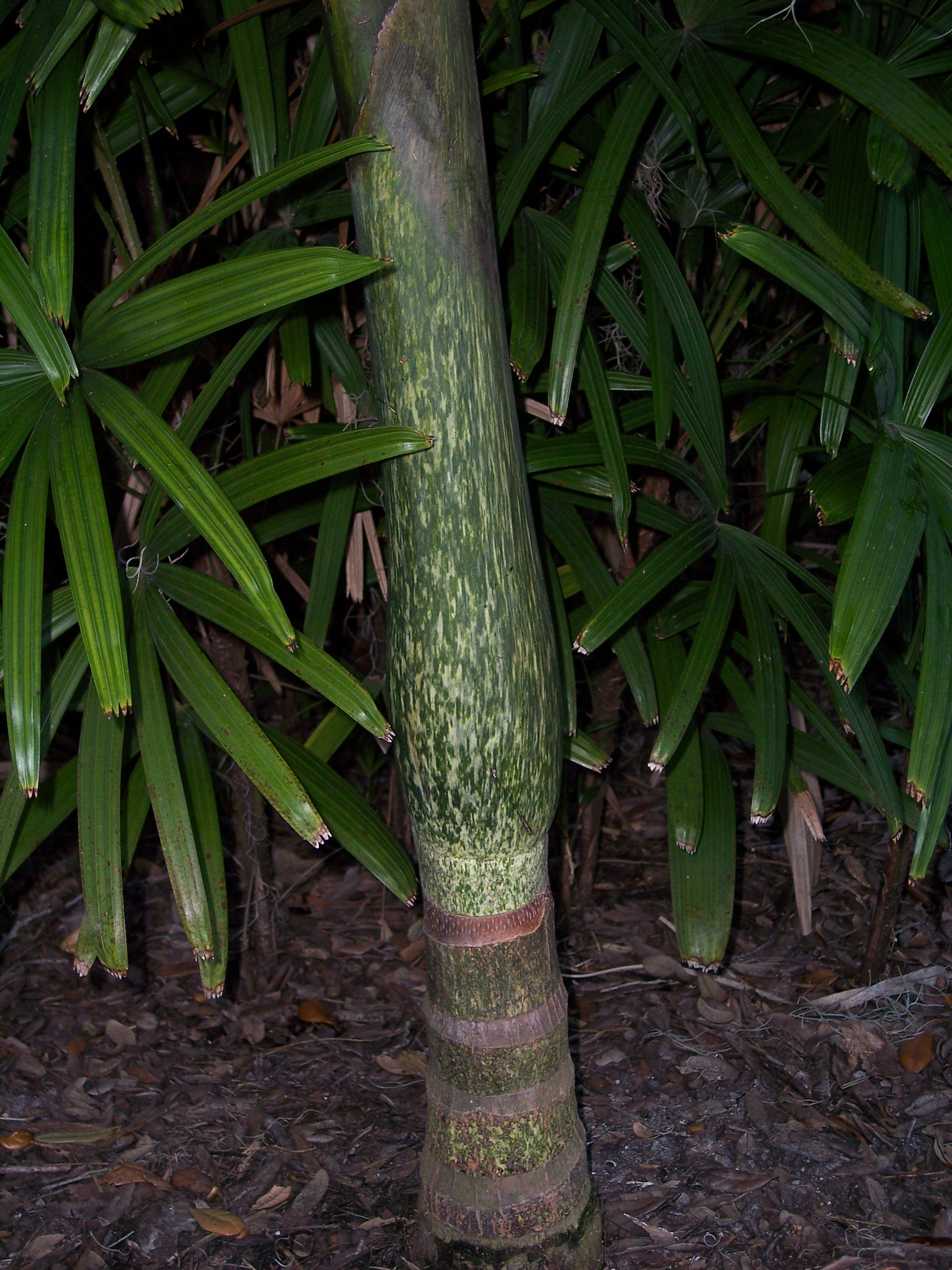
"Watermelon" colored crownshaft and trunk with distinct leaf scar rings

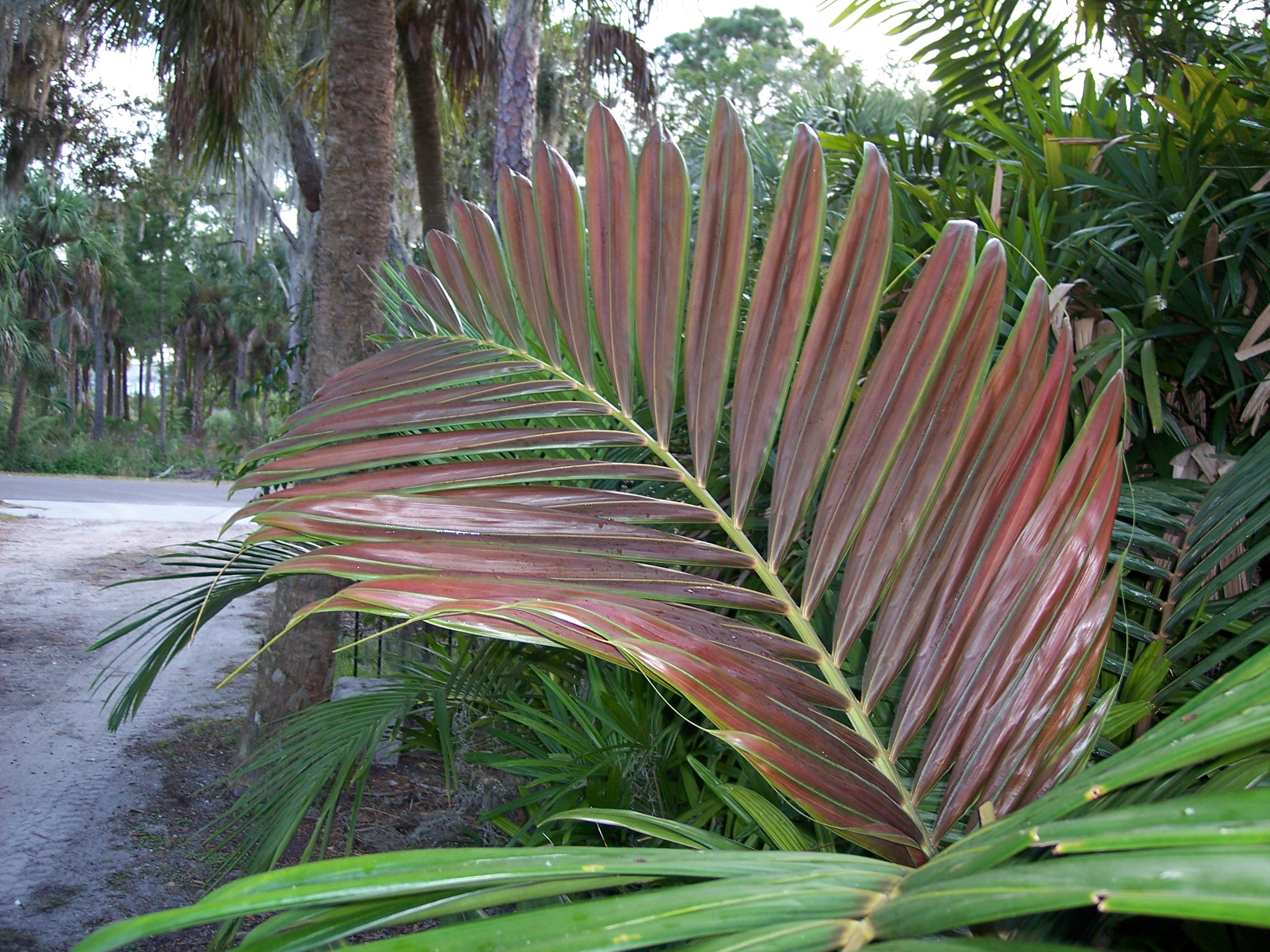
Colored new foliage

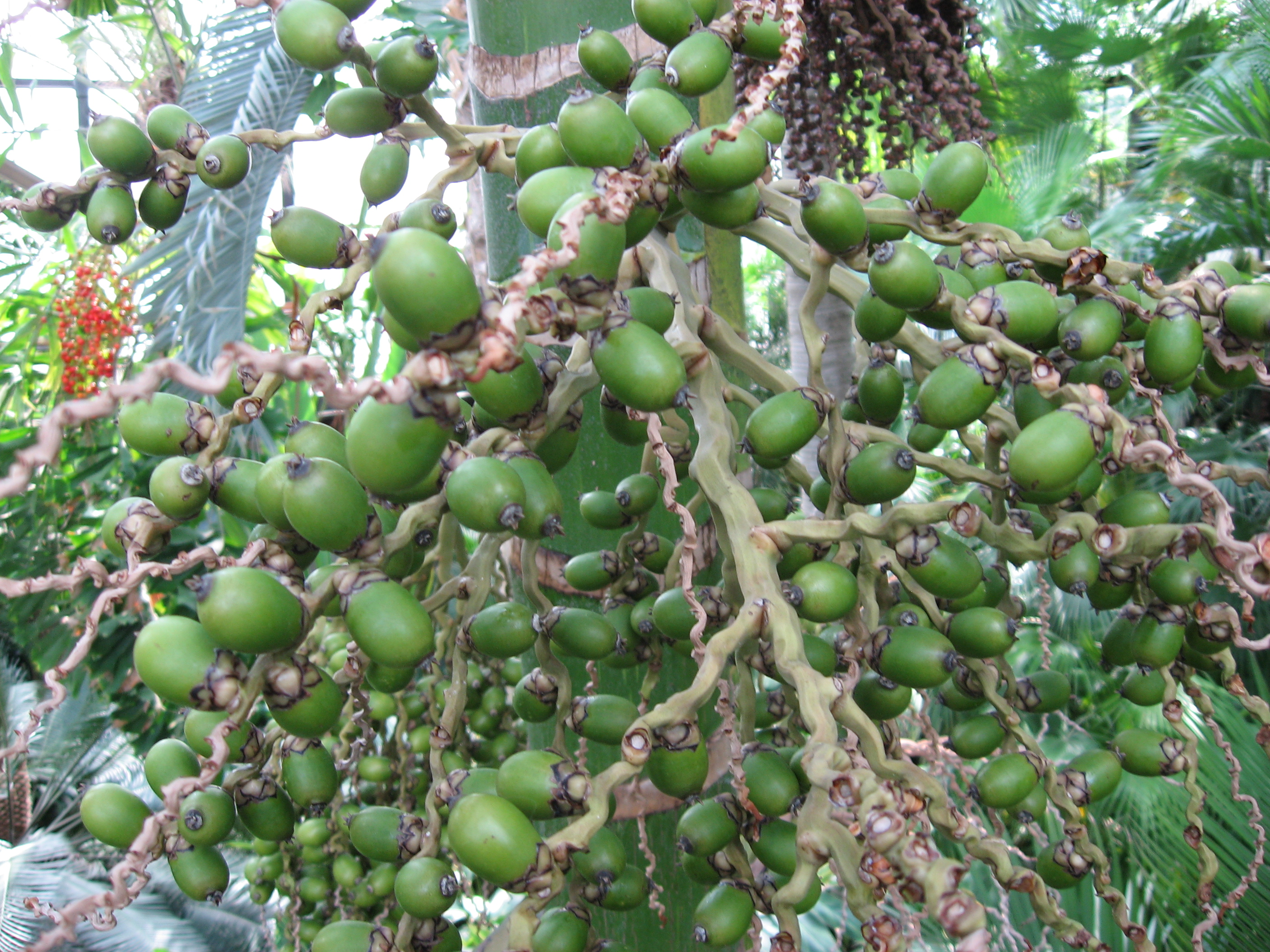
Unripe Fruit
