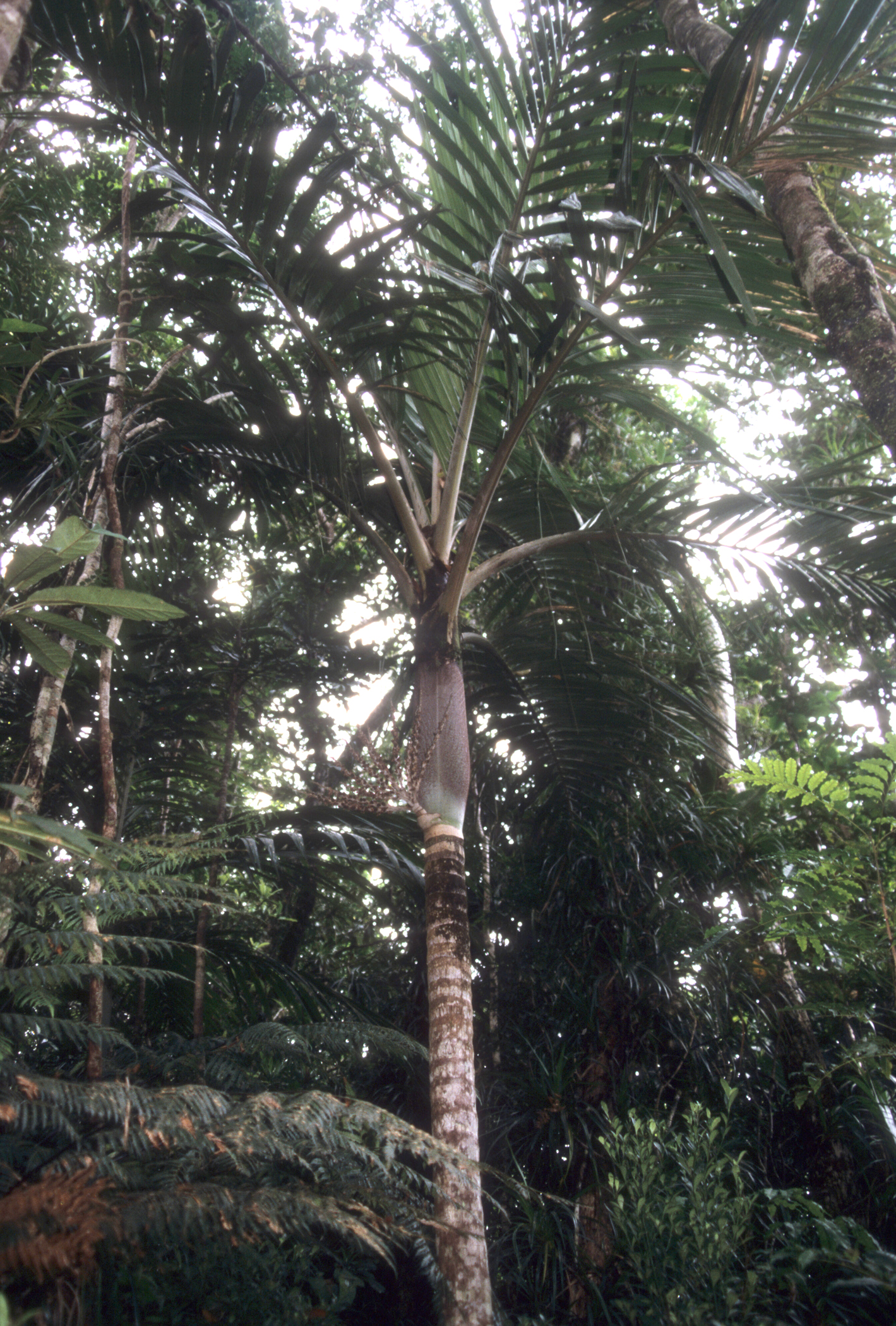

Conservation status
- Least Concern (IUCN 3.1)

Scientific classification
- Kingdom: Plantae
- Clade: Tracheophytes
- Clade: Angiosperms
- Clade: Monocots
- Clade: Commelinids
- Order: Arecales
- Family: Arecaceae
- Genus: Chambeyronia
- Species: C. lepidota

Binomial name
- Chambeyronia lepidota H.E.Moore

= Chambeyronia lepidota =

Species of palm

Chambeyronia lepidota is a species of flowering plant in the family Arecaceae.

== Distribution and habitat ==
It is a tree endemic to New Caledonia. It has been observed growing in dense, humid forests, on schist soil, at elevations betewenn 400 and 1400 meters.
