= Chambeyronia huerlimannii =

Conservation status
- Endangered (IUCN 3.1)

Scientific classification
- Kingdom: Plantae
- Clade: Tracheophytes
- Clade: Angiosperms
- Clade: Monocots
- Clade: Commelinids
- Order: Arecales
- Family: Arecaceae
- Genus: Chambeyronia
- Species: C. huerlimannii

Binomial name
- Chambeyronia huerlimannii (H.E.Moore) Hodel & C.F.Barrett

Synonyms
- Homotypic Synonyms: Actinokentia huerlimannii H.E.Moore

Species of palm

Chambeyronia huerlimannii is a species of flowering plant in the family Arecaceae.

== Distribution and habitat ==
It is endemic to New Caledonia. It is found in dense, humid forests or shrubby, ridge forests on serpentine soils at elevations between 800 to 850 meters.
