= Chambeyronia magnifica =

Conservation status
- Endangered (IUCN 3.1)

Scientific classification
- Kingdom: Plantae
- Clade: Tracheophytes
- Clade: Angiosperms
- Clade: Monocots
- Clade: Commelinids
- Order: Arecales
- Family: Arecaceae
- Genus: Chambeyronia
- Species: C. magnifica

Binomial name
- Chambeyronia magnifica (H.E.Moore) Hodel & C.F.Barrett

Synonyms
- Kentiopsis magnifica (H.E.Moore) Pintaud & Hodel; Mackeea magnifica H.E.Moore

Species of palm

Chambeyronia magnifica is a species of flowering plant in the palm family Arecaceae. It is a large, solitary, emergent palm found only in New Caledonia. It is native to northeastern Grande Terre, where it lives on Col d'Amos and the Pam Peninsula ridge. It grows in dense humid forest on soils derived from schist rocks from 480 to 550 metres elevation.

The species has an estimated area of occupancy (AOO) and extent of occurrence (EOO) of 24 km^{2}. It is threatened by habitat loss from frequent fires on Col d'Amos and degradation of the forest by feral pigs. It is assessed as endangered on the IUCN Red List.

It was first described as Mackeea magnifica in 1978 by Harold Emery Moore. In 1998 Jean-Christophe Pintaud and Donald Robert Hodel placed in genus Kentiopsis as Kentiopsis magnifica. In 2021 Hodel and Craig Barrett synonymized Kentiopsis with genus Chambeyronia, and renamed the species Chambeyronia magnifica.
