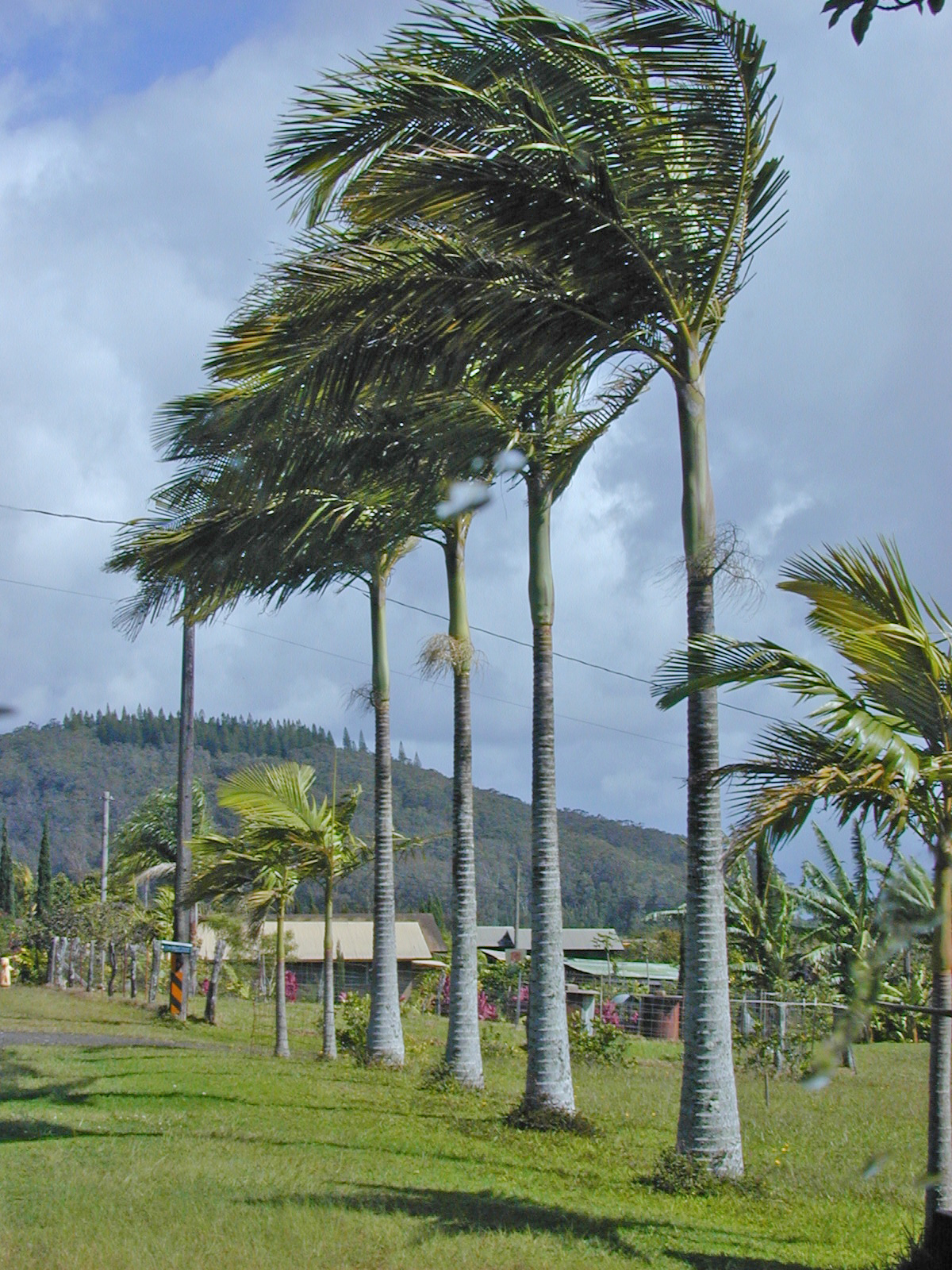

Conservation status
- Least Concern (IUCN 3.1)
- Least Concern (NCA)

Scientific classification
- Kingdom: Plantae
- Clade: Tracheophytes
- Clade: Angiosperms
- Clade: Monocots
- Clade: Commelinids
- Order: Arecales
- Family: Arecaceae
- Genus: Archontophoenix
- Species: A. alexandrae

Binomial name
- Archontophoenix alexandrae (F.Muell.) H.Wendl. & Drude

Synonyms
- Archontophoenix alexandrae var. beatriceae (F.Muell.) C.T.White; Archontophoenix alexandrae var. schizanthera H.Wendl. & Drude; Jessenia glazioviana Dammer; Ptychosperma alexandrae F.Muell.; Ptychosperma beatriceae F.Muell.; Ptychosperma drudei H.Wendl. ex Benth. & Hook.f.; Saguaster drudei (H.Wendl. ex Benth. & Hook.f.) Kuntze

= Archontophoenix alexandrae =

Species of palm endemic to Australia

Archontophoenix alexandrae, commonly known as Alexandra palm, king palm, northern Bangalow palm, or feather palm, is a palm endemic to Queensland, Australia. It was named in honour of Princess Alexandra of Denmark, but is often erroneously referred to by the misnomer Alexander palm.

== Description ==
Archontophoenix alexandrae is a tall, solitary palm growing to a height of 30 m (98 ft) with a trunk up to 30 cm (12 in) diameter, often swollen at the base, and bearing prominent leaf scars. The graceful crown has 8 to 10 pinnate, feather-like fronds that measure up to 4.5 m (15 ft) in length, with 60 to 80 leaflets on each side of the midrib. The pinnae are dark green above and silvery-grey underneath, measuring up to 75 cm (30 in) long, and the entire frond is usually twisted laterally. At the base of each frond is a large crownshaft up to 1 m (3.3 ft) high, coloured light green.

=== Flowers ===
The inflorescence of Archontophoenix alexandrae is a panicle, creamy white when first released from the protective sheath, or prophyll, that it develops within, and transitioning through light green as the fruits develop and finally to brown when it is shed from the tree. It measures between 50 and 100 cm (20 and 39 in) wide by 50 cm (20 in) long, and arises from the base of the crownshaft. Flowering occurs randomly throughout the year, and it is not uncommon to find a group of these palms, some of which carry fruit and/or flowers while others carry neither. Individual flowers are 3-petalled, creamy-white in colour and quite small—the staminate (functionally male) flowers measuring up to 10 mm (0.4 in) wide and the pistillate (functionally female) flowers up to 4 mm (0.16 in).

=== Fruit ===
The fruits are ovoid to globose with a persistent calyx. They are initially green turning bright red when ripe. They measure around 10–14 mm (0.4–0.6 in) in diameter and contain a single seed about 8 mm (0.3 in) diameter.

== Taxonomy ==
The species was originally described as Ptychosperma alexandrae by Ferdinand von Mueller in his eleven-volume work Fragmenta phytographiae Australiae in 1865. In 1875 the German botanists Hermann Wendland and Oscar Drude published a treatment of Australian palms in the journal Linnaea titled Palmae Australasicae, in which this species was renamed Archontophoenix alexandrae.

=== Etymology ===
The genus name is derived from the Ancient Greek ἄρχων (árkhōn), meaning 'chieftain' or 'ruler', combined with the palm genus Phoenix, and refers to the regal stature of the trees. The species epithet is given in honour of Princess Alexandra of Denmark.

== Distribution and habitat ==
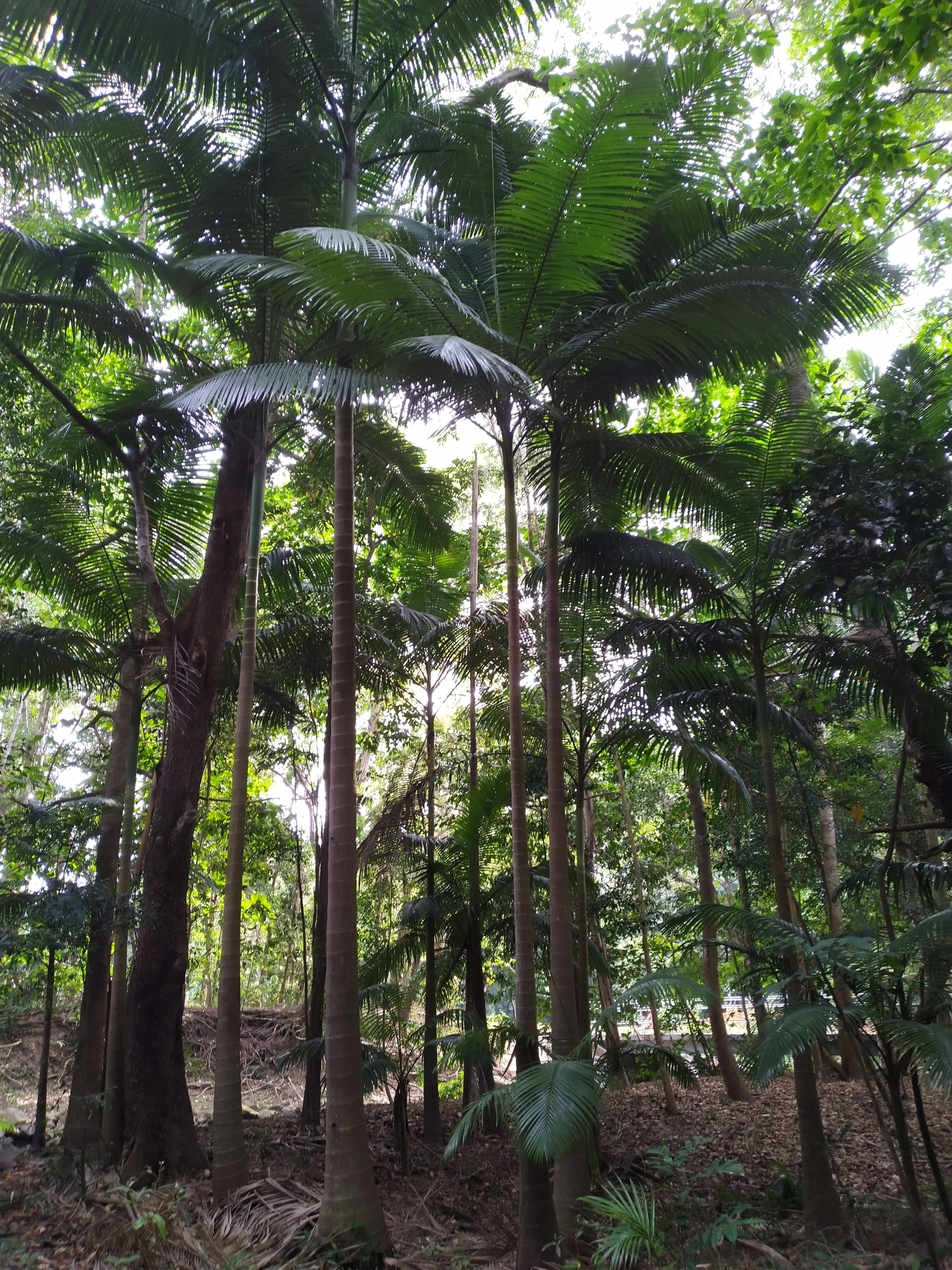
Alexandra palms dominate the forest in the flood zone beside Freshwater Creek, Cairns, Queensland.

The native range of this species is north-east and central-east Queensland, from the Melville Range in Cape York Peninsula to south of Gladstone. The altitudinal range is from sea level to 1,000 m (3,300 ft), although it is most commonly found in lowland riparian rainforest alongside river courses and swamps, often in locations that are severely inundated during heavy rain events. Their ability to withstand these conditions allows them to become the dominant species.

== Ecology ==
The fruit of the Alexandra palm is eaten by many bird species, notably the metallic starling (Aplonis metallica), which often descend on a tree as a flock and may consume all of the ripe fruits within an hour. Other common bird species include the Torresian imperial pigeon (Ducula spilorrhoa) and the wompoo fruit dove (Ptilinopus magnificus). Fruits are also eaten by fruit bats and the musky rat-kangaroo (Hypsiprymnodon moschatus).

== Uses ==
The Kuku Yalanji people of Far North Queensland ate the palm heart of this species.

== Cultivation ==
This species is easily grown from fresh seed, and is very popular in cultivation in Australia, both for private gardens and as a street and park tree. It is fast growing and will tolerate cooler climates outside the tropics where there are no frosts, and has been widely planted in many countries. It has become naturalised in Hawaii.

== Gallery ==
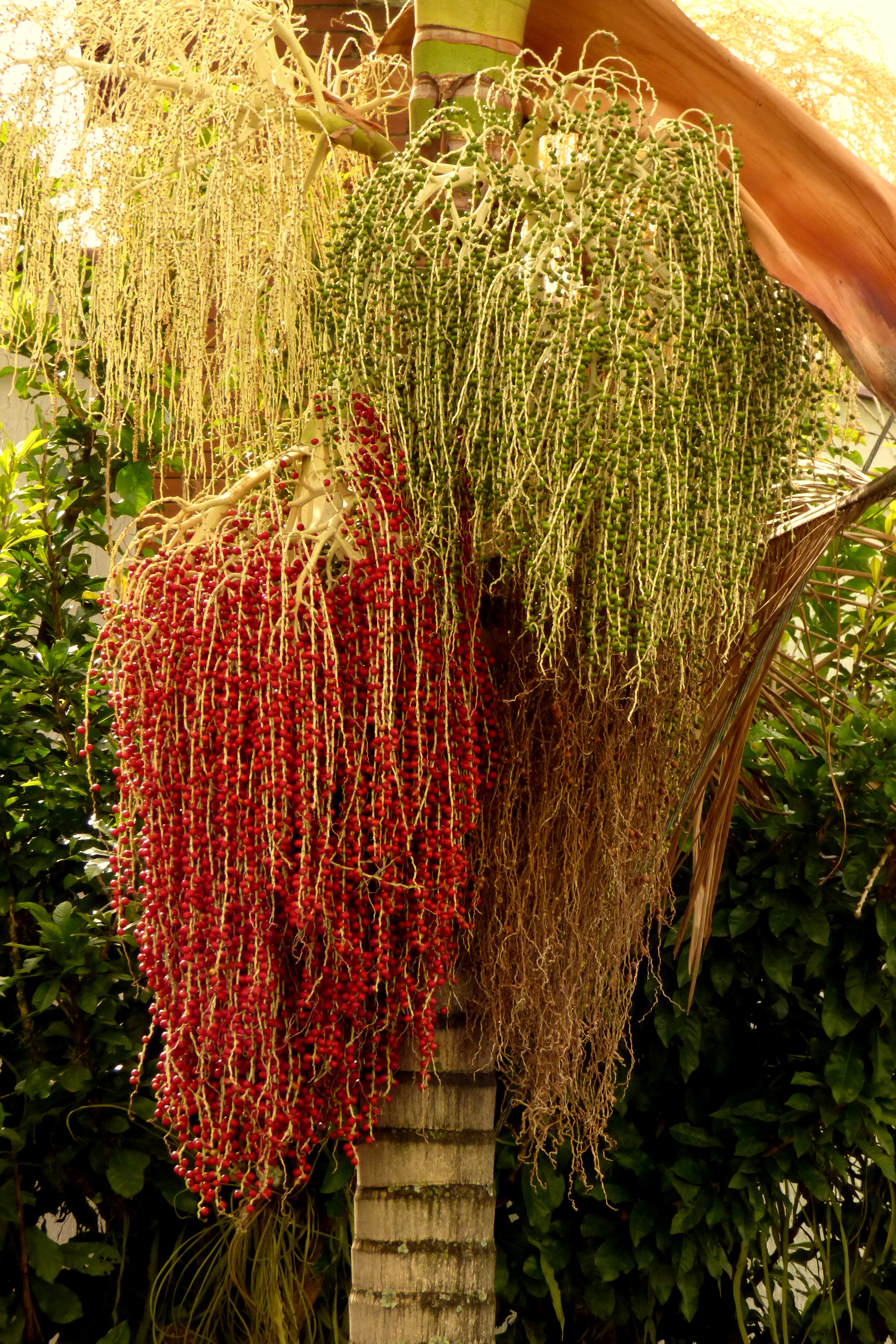
Tree with several inflorescences of varying ages

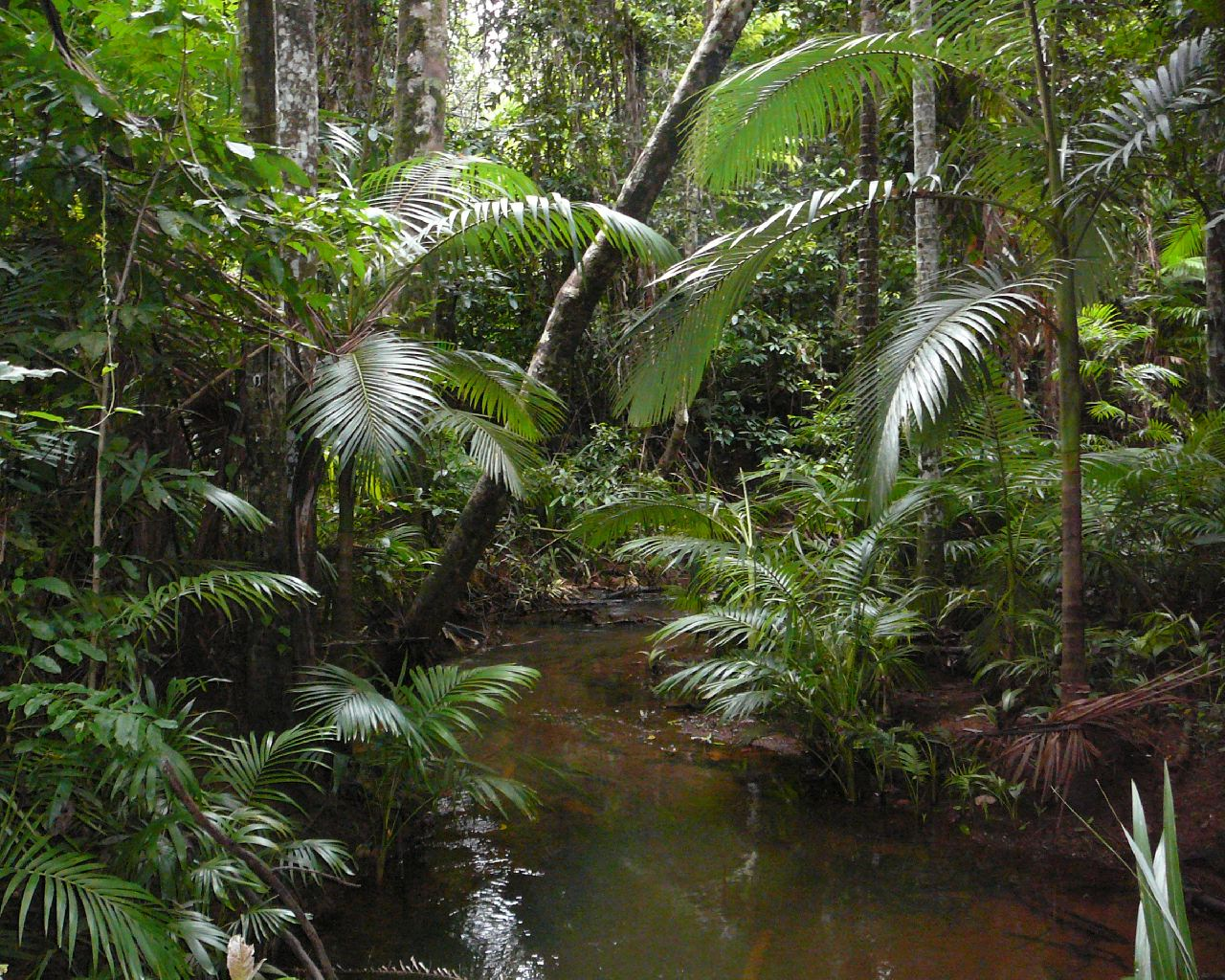
Habitat

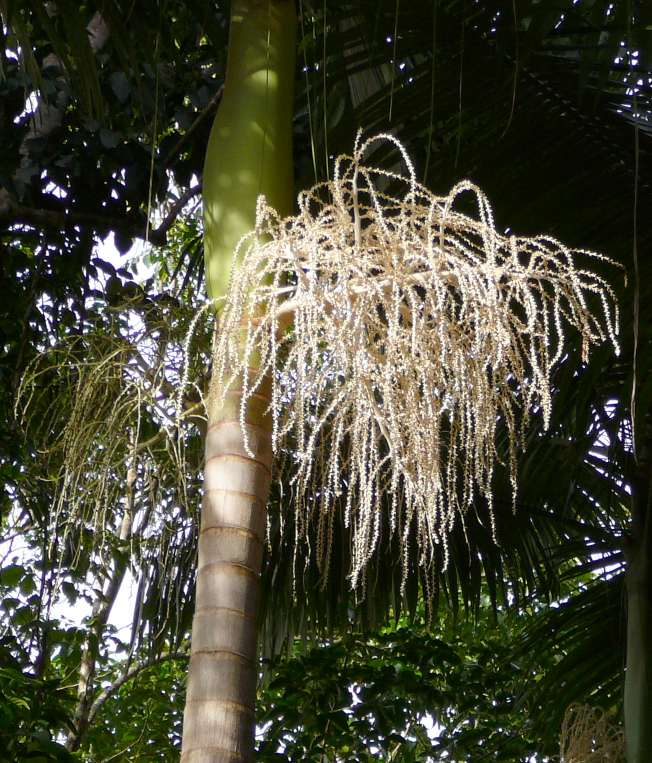
Flowering

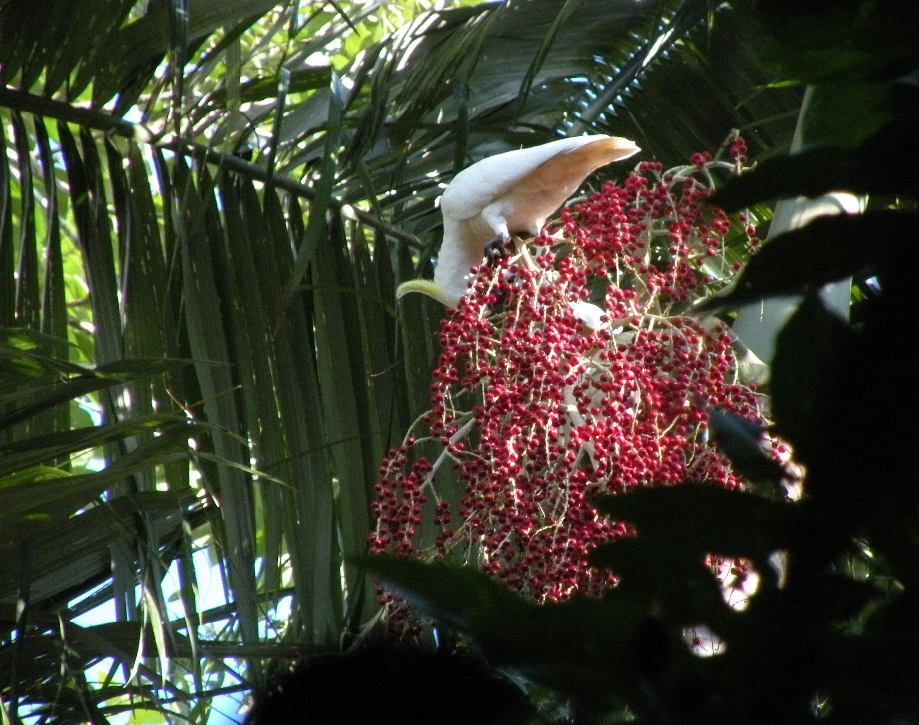
Fruiting

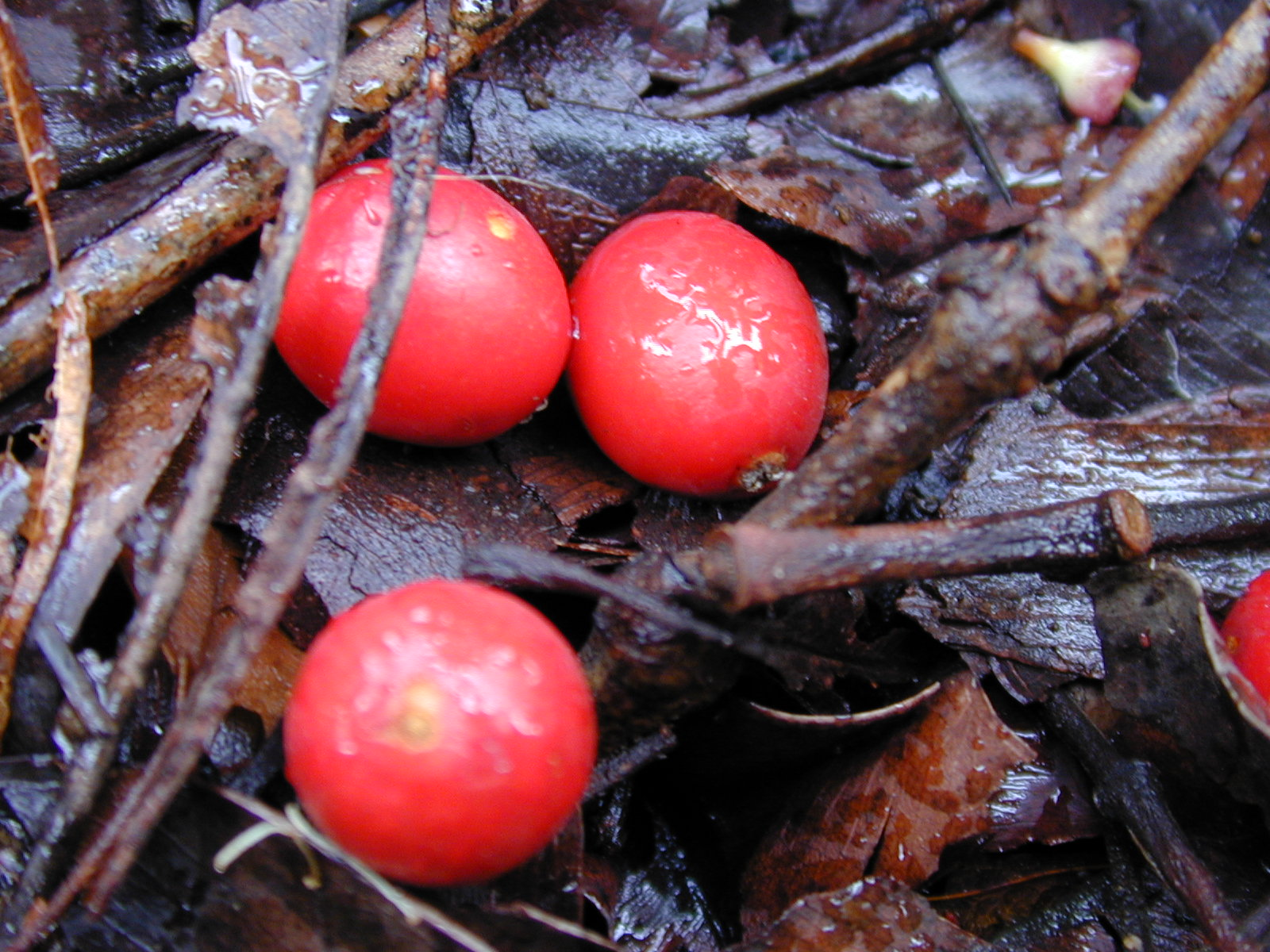
Fruit

== See also ==
- List of Australian plant species authored by Ferdinand von Mueller
