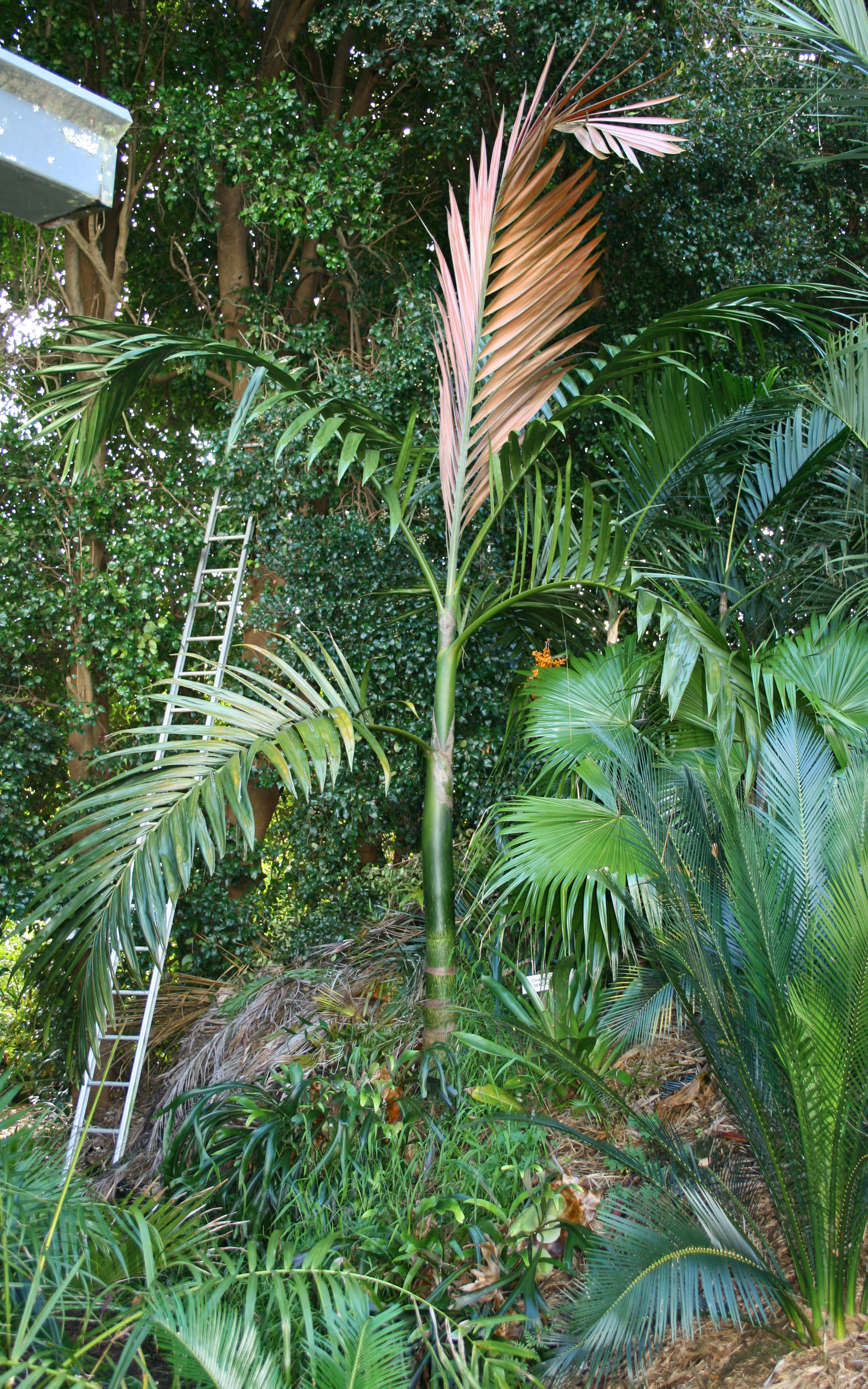
- Chambeyronia macrocarpa

Scientific classification
- Kingdom: Plantae
- Clade: Tracheophytes
- Clade: Angiosperms
- Clade: Monocots
- Clade: Commelinids
- Order: Arecales
- Family: Arecaceae
- Subfamily: Arecoideae
- Tribe: Areceae
- Subtribe: Archontophoenicinae
- Genus: Chambeyronia; Vieill.

Synonyms
- Actinokentia Dammer; Kentiopsis Brongn.; Mackeea H.E.Moore

= Chambeyronia =

Genus of palms

Chambeyronia is a genus of flowering plants in the family Arecaceae. It contains nine species, all endemic to New Caledonia:

== Species ==
- Chambeyronia divaricata (Brongn.) Hodel & C.F.Barrett
- Chambeyronia houailouensis Hodel & C.F.Barrett
- Chambeyronia huerlimannii (H.E.Moore) Hodel & C.F.Barrett
- Chambeyronia lepidota H.E.Moore
- Chambeyronia macrocarpa (Brongn.) Vieill. ex Becc.
- Chambeyronia magnifica (H.E.Moore) Hodel & C.F.Barrett
- Chambeyronia oliviformis (Brongn. & Gris) Hodel & C.F.Barrett
- Chambeyronia piersoniorum (Pintaud & Hodel) Hodel & C.F.Barrett
- Chambeyronia pyriformis (Pintaud & Hodel) Hodel & C.F.Barrett
