= Proto-Malayo-Polynesian language =

Reconstructed ancestor of the Malayo-Polynesian languages

Proto-Malayo-Polynesian
- PMP
- Reconstruction of: Malayo-Polynesian
- Region: Luzon Strait?
- Era: c. 2230 BCE
- Reconstructed ancestor: Proto-Austronesian
- Lower-order reconstructions: Proto-Philippine; Proto-Batak; Proto-Chamic; Proto-Malayic; Proto-South Sulawesi; Proto-Celebic; Proto-Oceanic

Proto-Malayo-Polynesian (PMP) is the reconstructed ancestor of the Malayo-Polynesian languages, which is by far the largest branch (by current speakers) of the Austronesian language family. Proto-Malayo-Polynesian is ancestral to all Austronesian languages spoken outside Taiwan, as well as the Yami language on Taiwan's Orchid Island. The first systematic reconstruction of Proto-Austronesian ("Uraustronesisch") by Otto Dempwolff was based on evidence from languages outside of Taiwan, and was therefore actually the first reconstruction of what is now known as Proto-Malayo-Polynesian.

== Phonology ==
=== Consonants ===
The following consonants can be reconstructed for Proto-Malayo-Polynesian (Blust 2009):

		Labial	Alveolar	Palatal	Retroflex	Velar		Uvular	Glottal
		Labial	Alveolar	Palatal	Retroflex	pal.	plain	Uvular	Glottal
Occlusive	nasal	*m	*n	*ñ /ɲ/			*ŋ		
Occlusive	voiceless	*p	*t	*c /c͡ç/			*k	*q	
Occlusive	voiced	*b	*d	*z /ɟ͡ʝ/	*D /ɖ/	*j /ɡʲ/	*g		
Continuant	voiceless		*s						*h
Continuant	voiced	*w	*l, *r	*y /j/				*R /ʀ/	

The phonetic value of the reconstructed sounds *p, *b, *w, *m, *t, *d, *n, *s, *l, *r, *k, *g, *ŋ, *q, *h was as indicated by the spelling. The symbols *ñ, *y, *z, *D, *j, *R are orthographic conventions first introduced by Dyen (1947). The assumed phonetic values are given in the table.

This consonant system is quite similar to the ancestral Proto-Austronesian (PAN) system, but is characterized by three mergers:

- PAN *t/*C > PMP *t
- PAN *n/*N > PMP *n
- PAN *h/*S > PMP *h

=== Vowels ===
The Proto-Austronesian vowels *a, *i, *u, *e (*e representing /ə/) and final diphthongs *ay, *aw, *uy, *iw remained unchanged.

== Alternative views ==
In a 2016 study, Roger Blench cast doubts that there was a unitary Proto-Malayo-Polynesian language. Rather, Malayo-Polynesian expansion across the Luzon Strait consisted of multi-ethnic crews rapidly settling across various locations in maritime Southeast Asia, as suggested by both archaeological and linguistic evidence. There was also a Malayo-Polynesian migration to Hainan; Blench (2016) notes that both Hlai and Austronesian peoples use the foot-braced backstrap loom.

== Lexicon ==
Below are selected animal and plant names in Proto-Malayo-Polynesian from the Austronesian Comparative Dictionary.

=== Animal names ===
Fish names
No.	Reconstruction levels	Common name	Scientific name	Proto-Malayo-Polynesian
710	PMP	a dove	Ducula spp.?	*baluj
2201	PMP	a fish	Scomberoides sp.	*daRi
9215	PMP	a fish, the fusilier	Caesionidae sp.	*sulig
8519	PMP	a fish, the sea perch, giant rockcod, giant grouper	Epinephelus spp.	*kuRapu
4366	PMP	a fish: the big-eyed scad	Trachiurops crumenophthalmus	*qatulay
251	PMP	a fruit-bearing plant	Pisonia umbellifera	*añuliŋ
1532	PMP	a white fish, the tarpon	Megalops cyprinoides	*bulan-bulan₁
1636	PMP	batfish	Platax spp.	*buna
1635	PMP	batfish	Platax spp.	*bunaR
4379	PMP	fish sp.: mullet sp.	Neomyxus chaptalli	*qawas
4380	PMP	fish sp.: the milkfish	Chanos chanos	*qawa₁
4378	PMP	fish sp.: the milkfish	Chanos chanos	*qawan
2095	PMP	goatfish	Mullidae	*tiqaw₂
9513	PMP	green jobfish	Aprion virescens	*qutun
3187	PMP	kind of striped or spotted marine fish, grouper	Epinephelus spp.	*keRteŋ
9509	PMP	needlefish	Istiophorus spp.	*saku₂
5519	PMP	porcupine fish, puffer fish	Diodon sp.	*taRutuŋ
9141	PMP	Spanish mackerel, kingfish	Scomberomorini spp.	*taŋiRi
5516	PMP	squirrelfish	Holocentrus spp.	*taRaqan
3168	PMP	suckerfish, remora; hold on by biting	Echeneis naucrates	*kemi
2492	PMP	suckerfish, remora; hold on by biting	Echeneis naucrates	*gemi
11354	PMP	surgeonfish	Acanthurus spp.	*qapaliR
11354	PMP	surgeonfish	Acanthurus spp.	*qapaliR
10662	PMP	unicorn fish	Acanthurus unicornis	*taRaq₂
4703	PMP	unicorn fish	Naso spp.	*qumi
4699	PMP	unicorn fish	Naso spp.	*qumay

Other animal names
No.	Reconstruction levels	Common name	Scientific name	Proto-Malayo-Polynesian
7001	PMP	the green turtle	Chelonia mydas	*peñu
9539	PMP	kingfisher	Halcyon spp.	*sikek
6845	PAN, PMP, PWMP	the Formosan rock monkey	Macaca cyclopis	*luCuŋ
3809	PMP	fruit bat, flying fox	Pteropus spp.	*paniki
9052	PMP	civet cat and similar small predatory mammals of the family Viverridae	Viverridae	*musaŋ
7811	PMP	giant clam	Tridacna gigas	*kima
4842	PMP	the spider conch	Lambis lambis	*Raŋa
8637	PMP	the spider conch	Lambis lambis	*Raŋak
8638	PMP	the spider conch	Lambis lambis	*RaŋaR
4390	PMP	coconut crab	Birgus latro	*qayuyu
4224	PMP	a small bee	Apis indica	*qani-Ruan
4283	PMP	a small bee	Apis indica	*qari-ñuan
6861	PAN, PMP, PWMP, PCEMP, PCMP	jungle leech	Haemadipsa spp.	*-matek
6864	PMP	jungle leech	Haemadipsa spp.	*qala-matek
1726	PMP	ringworm	Tinea imbricata	*buqeni
3800	PMP	fungus infection which produces light patches on the skin	Tinea flava or Pityriasis	*panaw₁

=== Plant names ===
Selected plant names
No.	Reconstruction levels	Common name	Scientific name	Proto-Malayo-Polynesian
8724	PMP	a cereal grass with edible seeds that are also used as beads, Job's tears	Coix lacryma-jobi	*zelay
4343	PMP	a climbing plant	Wedelia biflora	*qatay qatay₁
11282	PMP	a cycad	Cycas rumphii	*patuRu
3686	PMP	a fern	Lygodium spp.	*nituq
7071	PMP	a hairy vine	Pueraria hirsuta	*bahay
4562	PMP	a hardwood tree	Intsia bijuga, Afzelia bijuga	*qipil
484	PAN, PMP, PWMP, PCEMP, PCMP	a lily-like plant	Crinum asiaticum	*bakuŋ₁
4206	PMP	a palm	Oncosperma sp.?	*qanibuŋ
8448	PMP	a plant	Leea spp.	*mali
3566	PMP	a plant	Leea spp.	*mali-mali
7082	PAN, PMP, PWMP	a plant	Phragmites spp.	*qaReNu
71	PMP	a plant	Pipturus argenteus	*adamay
11885	PMP	a plant	Solanum nigrum	*hameti
4039	PAN, PMP, PWMP, PCEMP, PCMP	a plant	Urena lobata	*puluC
11265	PMP	a plant used to stun fish	Derris elliptica	*bunat
8455	PAN, PMP, PWMP, PCEMP, PCMP, PEMP, POC	a plant with roots that are pounded and put in rivers to stun fish	Derris elliptica	*tuba
590	PMP	a plant yielding useful fibers	Thespesia populnea	*balu₁
1832	PMP	a shore tree	Barringtonia spp.	*butun
1275	PMP	a shore tree	Calophyllum inophyllum	*bitaquR
301	PMP	a shore tree	Casuarina equisetifolia	*aRuhu
4290	PMP	a shore tree	Casuarina equisetifolia	*qaRuhu
10441	PMP	a shore tree with edible nuts	Terminalia catappa	*talisay
5317	PMP	a shrub	Cordyline, Dracaena	*siRi
717	PMP	a small shore tree	Hibiscus tiliaceus	*baRu
12684	PMP	a small tree bearing round, green fruit	Ehretia spp.	*kanawah
8398	PMP	a swamp palm	Nipa fruticans	*nipaq
10824	PMP	a tall forest tree which emits an unpleasant odor	Sterculia foetida	*bubuR₃
5189	PMP	a thorny tree	Caesalpinia spp.	*sepaŋ
612	PMP	a thorny vine	Smilax spp.	*banaR₁
620	PMP	a thorny vine	Smilax spp.	*banaw
2257	PMP	a tree	Alstonia scholaris	*ditaq
3274	PMP	a tree	Artocarpus sp.	*kulu₁
12727	PMP	a tree	Bischofia javanica	*tuquR₂
2574	PMP	a tree	Cordia dichotoma	*hanunaŋ
4243	PAN, PMP, PWMP, PCEMP, PCMP	a tree	Cordia dichotoma	*qaNuNaŋ
3103	PMP	a tree	Cordia spp.	*kanawa
10144	PMP	a tree	Cordia spp.	*kendal
6886	PMP	a tree	Cynometra spp.	*namut-namut
5661	PMP	a tree	Dolichandrone spathacea	*tui₁
2198	PMP	a tree	Dracontomelon edule	*daqu₁
2218	PMP	a tree	Erythrina spp.	*dedap
4279	PMP	a tree	Ficus spp.	*qaRa₁
5384	PMP	a tree	Gnetum gnemon	*suka₁
4220	PMP	a tree	Grewia spp.	*qanilaw
8451	PMP	a tree	Inocarpus spp., possibly the Tahitian chestnut: Inocarpus edulis	*gayam
3097	PMP	a tree	Murraya sp.	*kamuniŋ
782	PMP	a tree	Nauclea sp.	*baŋkal
3884	PMP	a tree	Ochrosia oppositifolia	*pauq
3649	PMP	a tree	Pterocarpus indica	*nara
3648	PMP	a tree	Pterocarpus indica	*naRah
738	PMP	a tree	Pterospermum sp.	*bayuR
3126	PMP	a tree	Schleichera trijuga	*kasambiʔ
3086	PMP	a tree	Sterculia foetida	*kalumpaŋ
2239	PMP	a tree	Trema orientalis	*deRuŋ₂
3903	PMP	a tree	Vitex pubescens	*pa(m)pa
7098	PMP	a tree with dense clusters of red flowers, the Indian coral tree	Erythrina indica	*dapdap₁
9114	PMP	a tree with edible fruit, and medicinal uses	Buchanania arborescens?	*balunuR
3104	PMP	a tree with fragrant flowers	Cananga odorata	*kanaŋa
12774	PMP	a tree, the Chinese mahogany or Philippine mahogany	Shorea albus	*bulah
2719	PMP	a vine	Flagellaria indica	*huaR
11109	PMP	an evergreen tree with decorative flowers	Cynometra ramiflora	*namut
1046	PAN, PMP, PWMP, PCEMP, PCMP, PEMP, POC	bamboo of very large diameter	Dendrocalamus sp.?	*betuŋ₁
9776	PAN, PMP, PWMP, PCEMP, PCMP	bamboo spp.	Bambusa spinosa?	*kawayan
11263	PMP	betel pepper	Piper betle	*bu-bulu
8466	PMP	bracket fungus	Polyporus spp.	*kulat₂
1146	PMP	calabash tree	Crescentia spp.	*bila₁
1223	PAN, PMP, PWMP	cane grass	Miscanthus sp.	*biRaSu
10249	PAN, PMP, PWMP	castor bean	Ricinus communis	*katawa
1582	PMP	cowrie shell	Cypraea mauritiana	*buliq₁
4358	PMP	cucumber	Cucumis sativus	*qatimun
10768	PMP	elephant grass, miscanthus grass	Themeda gigantea	*taŋelaj
1255	PMP	fan palm	Licuala rumphii	*biRu
7972	PMP	hardwood tree with edible fruit and valuable timber	Palaquium spp.	*ñatuq
7996	PMP	indigo plant and dye	Indigofera suffruticosa and Indigofera tinctoria	*taRum
7083	PMP	kind of fruit tree	Pometia pinnata	*tawan
6542	PMP	kind of mangrove, with bark used for dyeing	Ceriops spp.	*teŋeR
11007	PMP	mango tree and its fruit	Mangifera altissima?	*pahuq₁
8750	PAN, PMP, PWMP	millet sp.	Setaria italica (?)	*zawa₂
1033	PMP	millet sp., probably foxtail millet	Setaria italica	*betem
812	PMP	millet sp., probably foxtail millet	Setaria italica	*beteŋ₁
7254	PAN, PMP, PWMP	mulberry tree and fruit	Morus formosensis	*taNiud
11844	PMP	new shoots of cogon grass	Imperata cylindrica	*mimis₁
1763	PMP	palm sp.	Corypha elata	*buri₁
3089	PAN, PMP, PWMP	plant sp.	Diospyros discolor	*kamaya
3671	PMP	plant sp.	Donax canniformis, used as material for making baskets	*niniq₁
4614	PAN, PMP, PWMP, PCEMP, PCMP, PEMP, PSHWNG, POC	rattan	Calamus sp.	*quay
7169	PMP	stinging nettle	Laportea spp.	*la-lateŋ
7167	PMP	stinging nettle	Laportea spp.	*lateŋ
7183	PMP	stinging nettle	Laportea spp.	*zalateŋ
7185	PMP	stinging nettle	Laportea spp.	*zilateŋ
4204	PMP	sugar palm	Arenga spp.	*qanahaw
7953	PMP	sugarcane	Saccharum officinarum	*tebuh₁
2055	PMP	sugarcane	Saccharum officinarum	*tebuh₂
2399	PMP	sword grass	Imperata cylindrica	*eRiq
10161	PMP	sword grass	Imperata cylindrica	*guRun
12663	PMP	sword grass	Imperata cylindrica	*keRiq
4900	PAN, PMP, PWMP	sword grass	Imperata cylindrica	*Riaq
7486	PMP	taro	Colocasia esculenta	*tales
9775	PMP	the candlenut tree	Aleurites moluccanus	*kamiri
9775	PMP	the candlenut tree	Aleurites moluccanus	*kamiri
12248	PMP	the Indian cork tree	Millingtonia hortensis	*taŋga₂
11262	PMP	the Indian tulip tree	Thespesia populnea	*banaRu
3066	PMP	the kapok tree	Bombax ceiba	*kabu-kabu
3263	PMP	tree sp.	Schoutenia ovata	*kukun
5653	PMP	tree sp.	Sesbania grandiflora	*tudiq
8882	PMP	tree with dense clusters of red flowers, the Indian coral tree	Erythrina indica	*depdep
9942	PMP	tree with edible nut, the Canarium almond (or the galip or ngari nut)	Canarium indicum (Note: This tree was previously known as Canarium commune L., and is sometimes still erroneously called this; also conflated with the closely related C. vulgare.)	*kanari
4260	PMP	tree with leaves like sandpaper	Ficus spp.	*qa(m)pelas
3332	PMP	tree with poisonous sap	Antiaris toxicaria?	*laji₁
4722	PAN, PMP, PWMP, PCEMP, PCMP	tree with sticky fruits	Cordia spp.	*quNuNaŋ
10888	PMP	tree spp.	Barringtonia spp.	*putat
7652	PMP	turmeric	Curcuma longa	*kunij
1601	PAN, PMP, PWMP, PCEMP, PCMP, PEMP, PSHWNG, POC	type of slender bamboo	Schizostachyum spp.	*buluq₂
1219	PMP	wild taro, elephant's ear or itching taro; sexual itch	Alocasia spp.	*biRaq₁
1219	PMP	wild taro, elephant's ear or itching taro; sexual itch	Alocasia spp.	*biRaq₁
4625	PMP	yam	Dioscorea alata	*qubi

== See also ==
- Proto-Austronesian language
- Proto-Philippine language
- Proto-Oceanic language
- Proto-Polynesian language
