= Arixyleborus malayensis =

Scientific classification
- Kingdom: Animalia
- Phylum: Arthropoda
- Class: Insecta
- Order: Coleoptera
- Suborder: Polyphaga
- Infraorder: Cucujiformia
- Family: Curculionidae
- Genus: Arixyleborus
- Species: A. malayensis

Binomial name
- Arixyleborus malayensis (Schedl, 1954)

Synonyms
- Xyleboricus malayensis Schedl, 1954; Xyleborus yakushimanus Murayama, 1955

Species of beetle

Arixyleborus malayensis is a species of weevil found in India, Sri Lanka, China, Japan, Malaysia, Vietnam and Indonesia. This is the only species of Arixyleborus found in Japan and China.

== Description ==
Body is about 2.1 mm long. Body stout and cylindrical. Head, pronotum and elytra are blackish brown. Legs and antennae are yellowish brown. Head globose with weakly convex frons. There are few scattered granules above the epistomal margin. Eyes are elongate and deeply emarginate. Antenna with 5-segmented funicle, a short scape and an obliquely truncate club. Pronotum sub rectangular. Basal margin is weakly bisinuate. Scutellum subrounded and distinctly shiny. Male is similar to female but with pale frons and a weak median depression above epistornal margin. In males, elytra is slightly shorter than pronotum.

The protibia posterior face is inflated and granulate. Antennal club broader than tall. The posterolateral carina is costate. Pronotum lateral margin is distinctly costate where the anterior margin is elevated with a row of serrations. Elytral interstrial ridges are setose, with recumbent, hair-like setae. These interstrial ridges are denticulate. Elytral striae is strongly impressed whereas the elytral declivity is weakly shagreened.

== Biology ==
A polyphagous species, it has been recorded from several host plants. Adults have been found in very small, cut trees of about 3 cm diameter.

The host plants include: Albizzia lebbeck, Canarium indicum (Note: The PEET xyleborini source refers to the affected species as Canarium commune. This is not an officially recognised species name. C. indicum was previously called C. commune (L.), and is still sometimes erroneously called that. It could possibly also refer to the closely related Canarium vulgare), Dryobalanops oblongifolia, Eugenia, Myristica fragrans, Swietenia mahagoni and Vatica lanceifolia.
