= Canarium commune =

Canarium commune is a repeatedly synonymized species name and may refer to one of several species in the tree genus Canarium:

- Canarium indicum
- Canarium vulgare
- Canarium asperum
- Canarium zeylanicum
