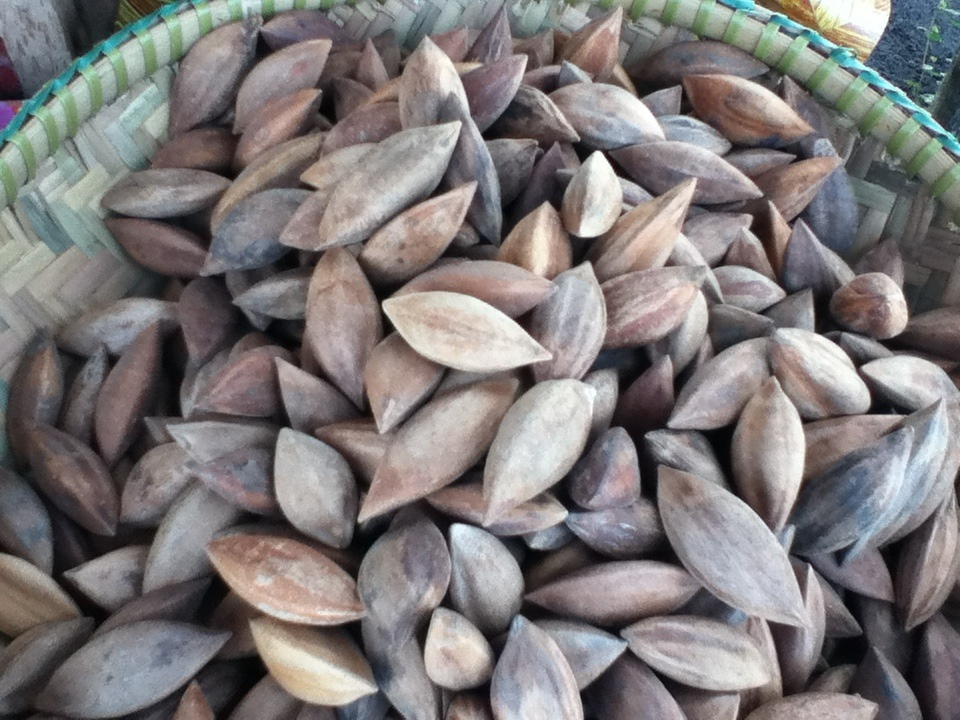
- Unshelled pili nuts from the Philippines

Conservation status
- Least Concern (IUCN 3.1)

Scientific classification
- Kingdom: Plantae
- Clade: Tracheophytes
- Clade: Angiosperms
- Clade: Eudicots
- Clade: Rosids
- Order: Sapindales
- Family: Burseraceae
- Genus: Canarium
- Species: C. ovatum

Binomial name
- Canarium ovatum Engl.

Synonyms
- Canarium pachyphyllum G.Perkins; Canarium melioides Elmer

= Canarium ovatum =

Pili

Species of flowering plant

Pilinuts (Canarium ovatum), dried
Nutritional value per 100 g (3.5 oz)
- Energy: 3,008 kJ (719 kcal)
- Carbohydrates: 3.98 g
- Fat: 79.55 g
- Saturated: 31.184 g
- Monounsaturated: 37.229 g
- Polyunsaturated: 7.605 g
- Protein: 10.80 g
Amino acids
| Tryptophan | 0.189 g |
| Threonine | 0.407 g |
| Isoleucine | 0.483 g |
| Leucine | 0.890 g |
| Lysine | 0.369 g |
| Methionine | 0.395 g |
| Cystine | 0.189 g |
| Phenylalanine | 0.497 g |
| Tyrosine | 0.381 g |
| Valine | 0.701 g |
| Arginine | 1.516 g |
| Histidine | 0.255 g |
| Alanine | 0.509 g |
| Aspartic acid | 1.222 g |
| Glutamic acid | 2.393 g |
| Glycine | 0.650 g |
| Proline | 0.471 g |
| Serine | 0.599 g |
Vitamins and minerals
| Vitamins | Quantity %DV^{†} |
| Vitamin A equiv. | 0% 2 μg |
| Thiamine (B1) | 76% 0.913 mg |
| Riboflavin (B2) | 7% 0.093 mg |
| Niacin (B3) | 3% 0.519 mg |
| Vitamin B6 | 28% 0.479 mg |
| Folate (B9) | 15% 60 μg |
| Vitamin B12 | 0% 0.00 μg |
| Vitamin C | 1% 0.6 mg |
| Minerals | Quantity %DV^{†} |
| Calcium | 11% 145 mg |
| Copper | 106% 0.958 mg |
| Iron | 20% 3.53 mg |
| Magnesium | 72% 302 mg |
| Manganese | 101% 2.313 mg |
| Phosphorus | 46% 575 mg |
| Potassium | 17% 507 mg |
| Sodium | 0% 3 mg |
| Zinc | 27% 2.97 mg |
- Other constituents: Quantity
- Water: 2.77 g
- Link to USDA Database entry
- ^{†}Percentages estimated using US recommendations for adults, except for potassium, which is estimated based on expert recommendation from the National Academies.

Canarium ovatum, the pili (Central Bikol and Filipino: pili, /ˈpiːliː/ PEE-lee;), is a species of tropical tree belonging to the genus Canarium. It is one of approximately 600 species in the family Burseraceae. C. ovatum are native to the Philippines. They are commercially cultivated in the Philippines for their edible nuts and are believed to be indigenous to that country. The fruit and tree are often vulgarized with the umbrella term of "Java almond" which mixes multiple species of the same genus, Canarium.

== Description ==
The C. ovatum tree is a symmetrically shaped evergreen, averaging 20 m (66 ft) tall with resinous wood and resistance to strong winds. It is dioecious, with flowers borne on cymose inflorescence at the leaf axils of young shoots. As in papaya and rambutan, functional hermaphrodites exist in C. ovatum. Pollination is by insects. Flowering is frequent and fruits ripen through a prolonged period of time. The ovary contains three locules, each with two ovules; most of the time only one ovule develops.

The fruit of C. ovatum is a drupe, 4 to 7 cm (1.6 to 2.8 in) long, 2.3 to 3.8 cm (0.91 to 1.50 in) in diameter, and weighs 15.7 to 45.7 g (0.55 to 1.61 oz). The skin (exocarp) is smooth, thin, shiny, and turns purplish black when the fruit ripens; the pulp (mesocarp) is fibrous, fleshy, and greenish yellow in color, and the hard shell (endocarp) within protects a normally dicotyledonous embryo. The basal end of the shell (endocarp) is pointed and the apical end is more or less blunt; between the seed and the hard shell (endocarp) is a thin, brownish, fibrous seed coat developed from the inner layer of the endocarp. This thin coat usually adheres tightly to the shell and/or the seed. Much of the kernel weight is made up of the cotyledons, which are about 4.1–16.6% of the whole fruit; it is composed of approximately 8% carbohydrate, 11.5–13.9% protein, and 70% fat. Kernels from some trees may be bitter, fibrous or have a turpentine odor.

== Distribution and habitat ==
C. ovatum's distribution range is the Philippines.

C. ovatum is a tropical tree preferring deep, fertile, well drained soil, warm temperatures, and well distributed rainfall. It cannot tolerate the slightest frost or low temperature. Refrigeration of seeds at 4 to 13 °C (39 to 55 °F) resulted in loss of viability after 5 days. Seed germination is highly recalcitrant, reduced from 98 to 19% after 12 weeks of storage at room temperature; seeds stored for more than 137 days did not germinate. Asexual propagations using marcotting, budding, and grafting were too inconsistent to be used in commercial production. Young shoots of C. ovatum were believed to have functional internal phloems, which rendered bark ringing ineffective as a way of building up carbohydrate levels in the wood. Success in marcottage may be cultivar-dependent. The production standard for a mature C. ovatum tree is between 100 and 150 kg (220 and 330 lb) of in-shell nut, with the harvest season from May to October and peaking between June and August. There are high variations in kernel qualities and production between seedling trees.

Most C. ovatum kernels tend to stick to the shell when fresh, but come off easily after being dried to 3–5% moisture (30 °C (86 °F) for 27 to 28 h). Shelled nuts, with a moisture content of 2.5–4.6%, can be stored in the shade for one year without deterioration of quality.

== Cultivation ==
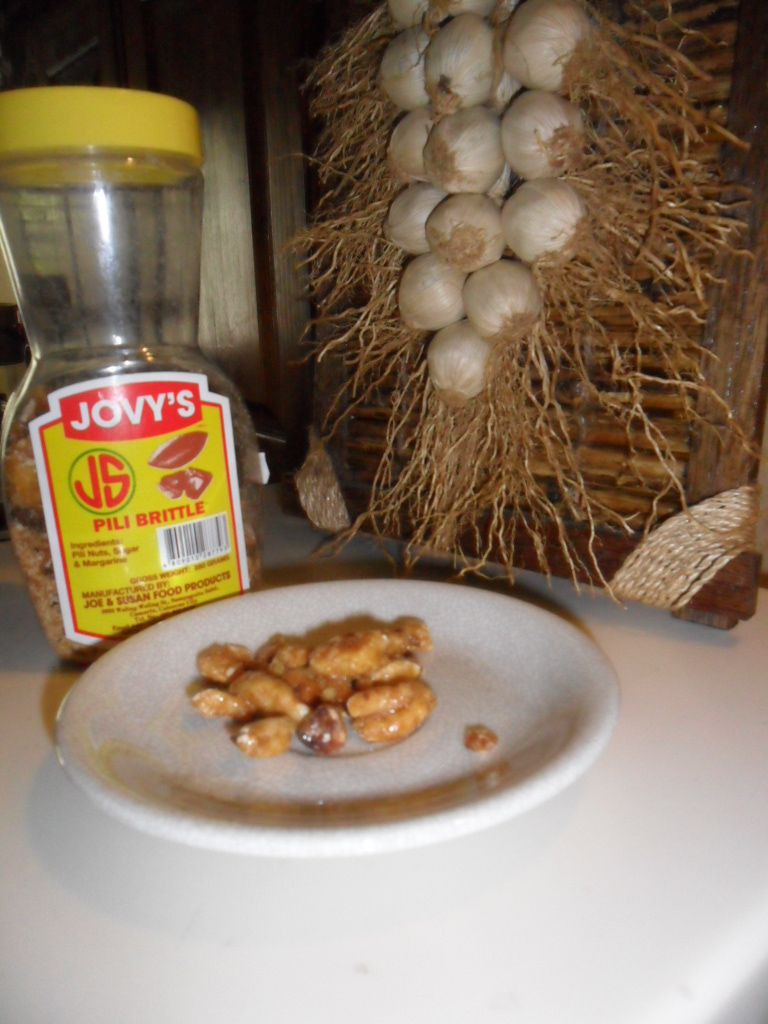
Pili brittle, made from Canarium ovatum nuts, sugar, and margarine

In the Philippines, production centers are located in the Bicol region, provinces of Sorsogon, Albay, and Camarines Sur, southern Tagalog, and eastern Visayas. The species is considered a flagship commodity of the Bicol region, the primary location of the pili nut trade. There is almost no commercial planting of this crop; fruits are collected from natural stands in the mountains near these provinces. In 1977, the Philippines exported approximately 3.8 t of pili preparation to Guam and Australia.

=== Propagation ===
The pili nut tree can be propagated by seed, marcotting, patch budding, cleft grafting, and inarching. Germination by seed takes about 30 to 80 days, and in about three to four years, the sapling can reach a juvenile height of about 2 meters. The trees are expected to start fruiting after 5 to 6 years from seedlings, reaching economic yield in the 10th year. Though propagation by seedlings is most common, asexual propagation is becoming preferred, for production of more female plants, removal of the juvenile period, and uniformity of the genetics, though to preserve genetic variability, seedlings are still created by sexual reproduction. Marcotting and air layering are the simplest of asexual propagation methods for pili, though success can vary. This issue comes from the branch unsuccessfully rooting after severing from the mother tree. Commercially, in the Philippines, cleft or wedge grafting with defoliated budsticks is used with rootstocks in large containers or directly in the field during the months between November and February, when the weather is cool and dry. This has an average success rate of 85%. Patch budding is found to be the most efficient for large-scale propagation work. Similarly to cleft or wedge grafting, the rootstocks are well watered and fertilized and the defoliated budwoods are cultivated from young, actively growing trees. This is also done in the months between November and February in the Philippines, having a success rate as high as 75–80%.

==== Future prospects ====
The immediate concern in C. ovatum production is the difficulty of propagation. The lack of an effective clonal propagation method not only hampers the collection of superior germplasm but also makes it almost impossible to conduct feasibility trials of this crop. C. ovatum cultivars such as 'Red', 'Albay', and 'Katutubo' were selected in the Philippines. The Department of Agriculture has been working to synthesize a tree that is commercially viable. The National Clonal Germplasm Repository at Hilo, USDA-ARS, has initiated studies of in vitro and vegetative propagation for the multiplication and long-term preservation of pili. A recently released pili nut tree cultivar in Hawaii, 'Poamoho', may further stimulate the interest in this crop. Besides the desirable production and quality attributes, its kernels separate easily from the hard shell without the need of prior drying (30 °C (86 °F) for 27 to 28 hours).

== Uses ==
The young shoots and the fruit pulp are edible. The shoots are used in salads, and the pulp is eaten after it is boiled and seasoned. Boiled pili pulp resembles the sweet potato in texture; it is oily (about 12%) and is considered to have food value similar to the avocado. Pulp oil can be extracted and used for cooking or as a substitute for cottonseed oil in the manufacture of soap and edible products. The stony shells are excellent as fuel or as porous, inert growth media for orchids and anthurium.

The tree's sap is also used for igniting fire, substituting for gasoline. Fresh saps were gathered from slashed tree trunk or shallow cuts, then gathered before it dries up completely.

The most important product from pili is the kernel. A testa (seed coat) is between the shell and the kernel. When raw, its flavor resembles that of roasted pumpkin seed, and when roasted, its nutty flavor and waxy texture make it similar to the pine nut. Research from the Institute of Plant Breeding, University of the Philippines Los Baños, describes pili nuts of high quality as large, round kernel, and a thin pulp and shell. The contents should have a white pulp, high in protein and oils with mild nutty flavor.

In the Philippines, pili is used in candies and brittle.

== As "Java almond" tree ==
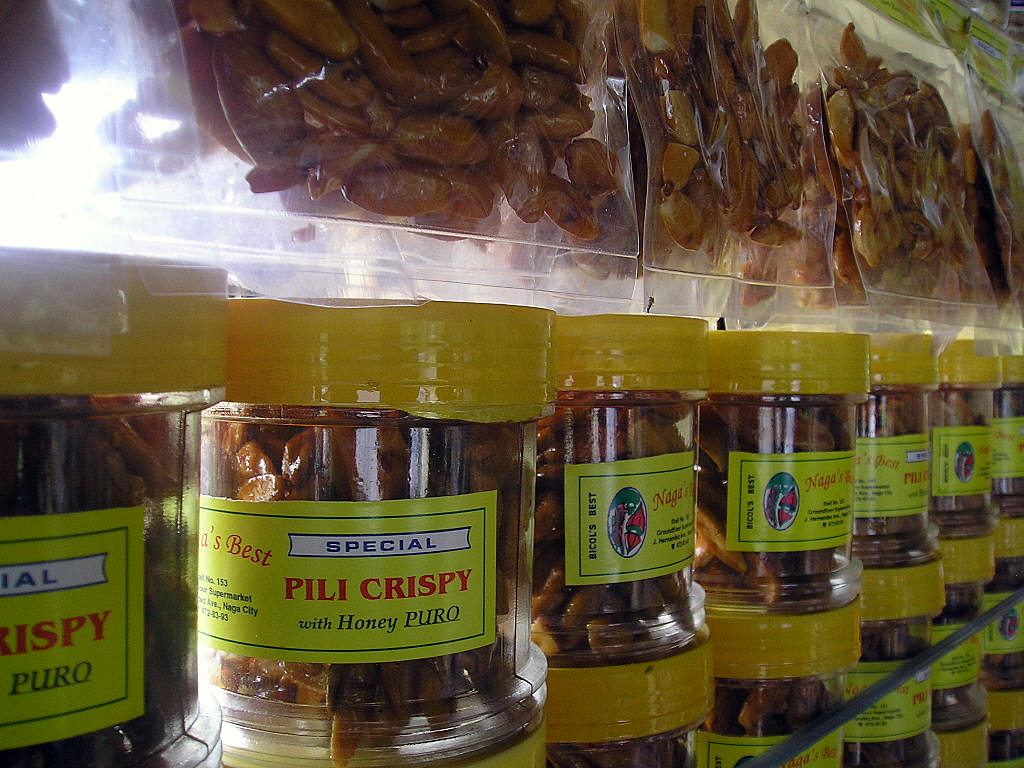
Candied pili nuts from Camarines Sur province, Philippines

Often called "Java almond", Canarium ovatum's fruit can be found bunched with other species of the same genus. These can be: Canarium vulgare, Canarium indicum which are not cultivated in the Philippines. The nickname "Java almond" is a name casually given to the fruits of Canarium species members where their range includes maritime Southeast Asia, Papua New Guinea, and Northern Australia.

Although they are grown as ornamental trees in many areas of the Old World tropics of Indonesia, Malaysia and the Philippines, Indonesia and the Philippines harvest and use it commercially. However, the latter's natives were believed to be the first to cultivate the aforesaid nut by boiling the pulp to make them edible. It is also sold commercially in the United States of America under the Pili Hunters Brand.

In Indonesia and Malaysia, their "Java almond" is called kenari from Canarium vulgare and C. indicum trees (syn.: C. commune, C. amboinense).

In Indonesia, especially in Minahasa and Moluccas islands, the kernels are used for making cake, bobengka in Minahasan or bubengka in Maluku. Java almond kernel is also used in chocolate, ice cream, and baked goods. The largest buyers of pili nuts are in Hong Kong and Taiwan; the kernel is one of the major ingredients in one type of the famous Chinese festive desserts known as the "moon cake".

The kernel is composed of about 70% fat, 11.5–13.9% protein, and 8% carbohydrate. The light yellowish kernel oil is composed of about 44% oleic acid, 35% palmitic acid, 10% linoleic acid, and 10% stearic acid. The java almond kernal mineral content is highest in potassium, phosphorus, magnesium, and calcium (in that order). But high levels of phytic acid and tannic acid can prevent mineral absorption during digestion.

== See also ==
- List of culinary nuts
- Canarium luzonicum, the elemi tree
