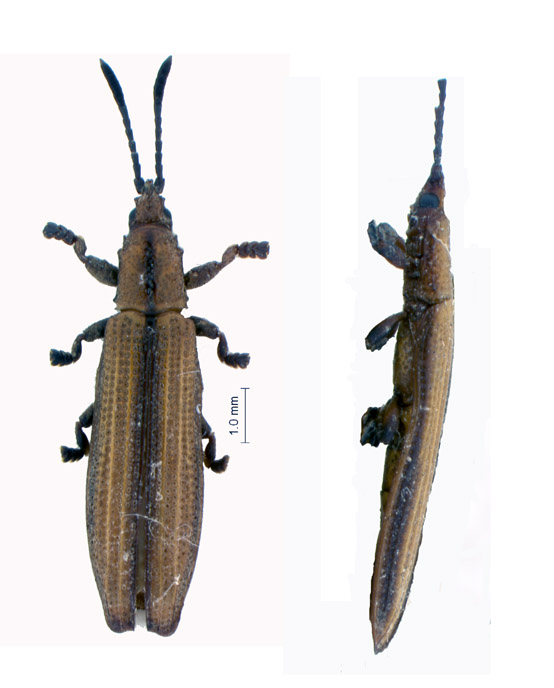

Scientific classification
- Kingdom: Animalia
- Phylum: Arthropoda
- Clade: Pancrustacea
- Class: Insecta
- Order: Coleoptera
- Suborder: Polyphaga
- Infraorder: Cucujiformia
- Family: Chrysomelidae
- Genus: Gestronella
- Species: G. centrolineata

Binomial name
- Gestronella centrolineata (Fairmaire, 1890)

Synonyms
- Xiphispa centrolineata Fairmaire, 1890

= Gestronella centrolineata =

Species of beetle

Gestronella centrolineata is a species of beetle of the family Chrysomelidae. It is found in Madagascar.

== Life history ==
The recorded host plants for this species are various palms, including Acanthophoenix crinita and Cocos nucifera.
