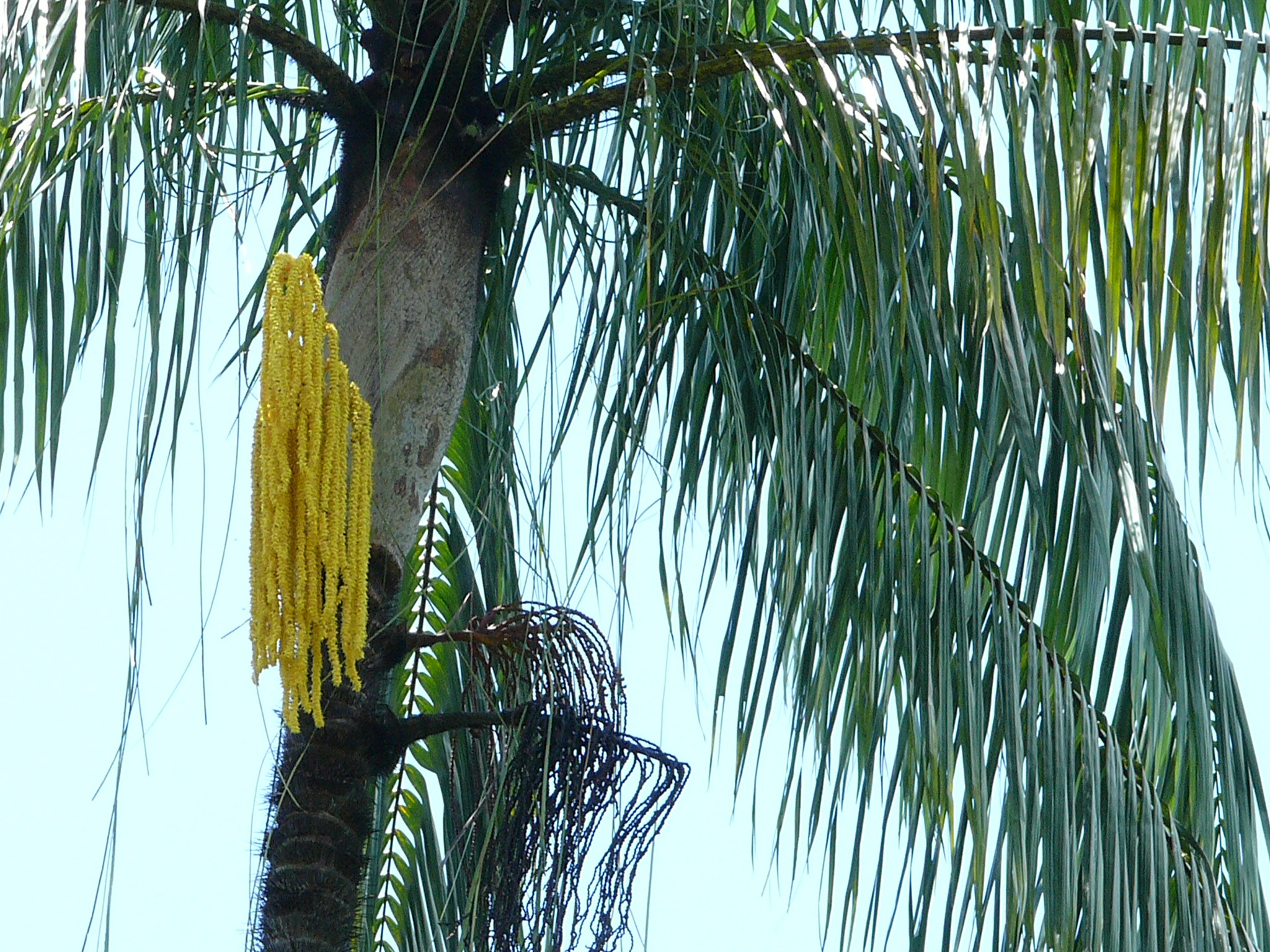
- Oncosperma tigillarium

Scientific classification
- Kingdom: Plantae
- Clade: Tracheophytes
- Clade: Angiosperms
- Clade: Monocots
- Clade: Commelinids
- Order: Arecales
- Family: Arecaceae
- Subfamily: Arecoideae
- Tribe: Areceae
- Subtribe: Oncospermatinae; Benth. & Hook.f.

Genera
- Acanthophoenix - Deckenia - Oncosperma - Tectiphiala

= Oncospermatinae =

Subtribe of palms

Oncospermatinae is a palm tree subtribe in the tribe Areceae.

Genera:

- Acanthophoenix
- Deckenia
- Oncosperma
- Tectiphiala
