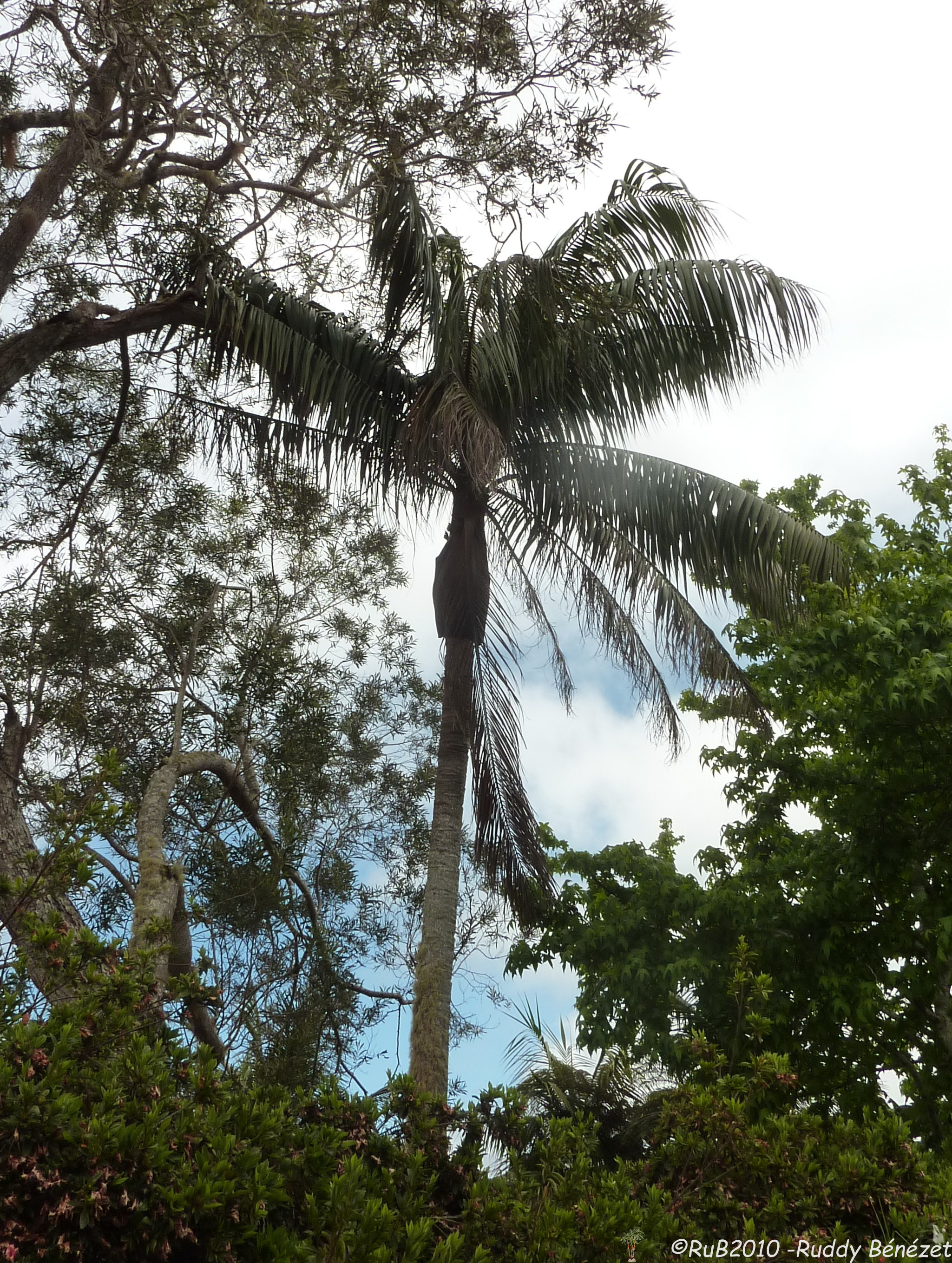

Scientific classification
- Kingdom: Plantae
- Clade: Tracheophytes
- Clade: Angiosperms
- Clade: Monocots
- Clade: Commelinids
- Order: Arecales
- Family: Arecaceae
- Genus: Acanthophoenix
- Species: A. crinita

Binomial name
- Acanthophoenix crinita (Bory) H.Wendl.

Synonyms
- Areca crinita Bory

= Acanthophoenix crinita =

Species of palm

Acanthophoenix crinita is a species of palm which is endemic to Réunion.

This palm was first described as Areca crinita by French naturalist Jean Baptiste Bory de Saint-Vincent in 1804 and classified by German botanist Hermann Wendland in its own genus Acanthophoenix in 1867.

In his 1995 checklist of seed plants, Rafaël Govaerts considered A. crinita to be a synonym of Acanthophoenix rubra, as did Govaerts and John Dransfield in their 2005 checklist of palms. However, in his revision of the genus, N. Ludwig recognised A. crinita as a separate species.

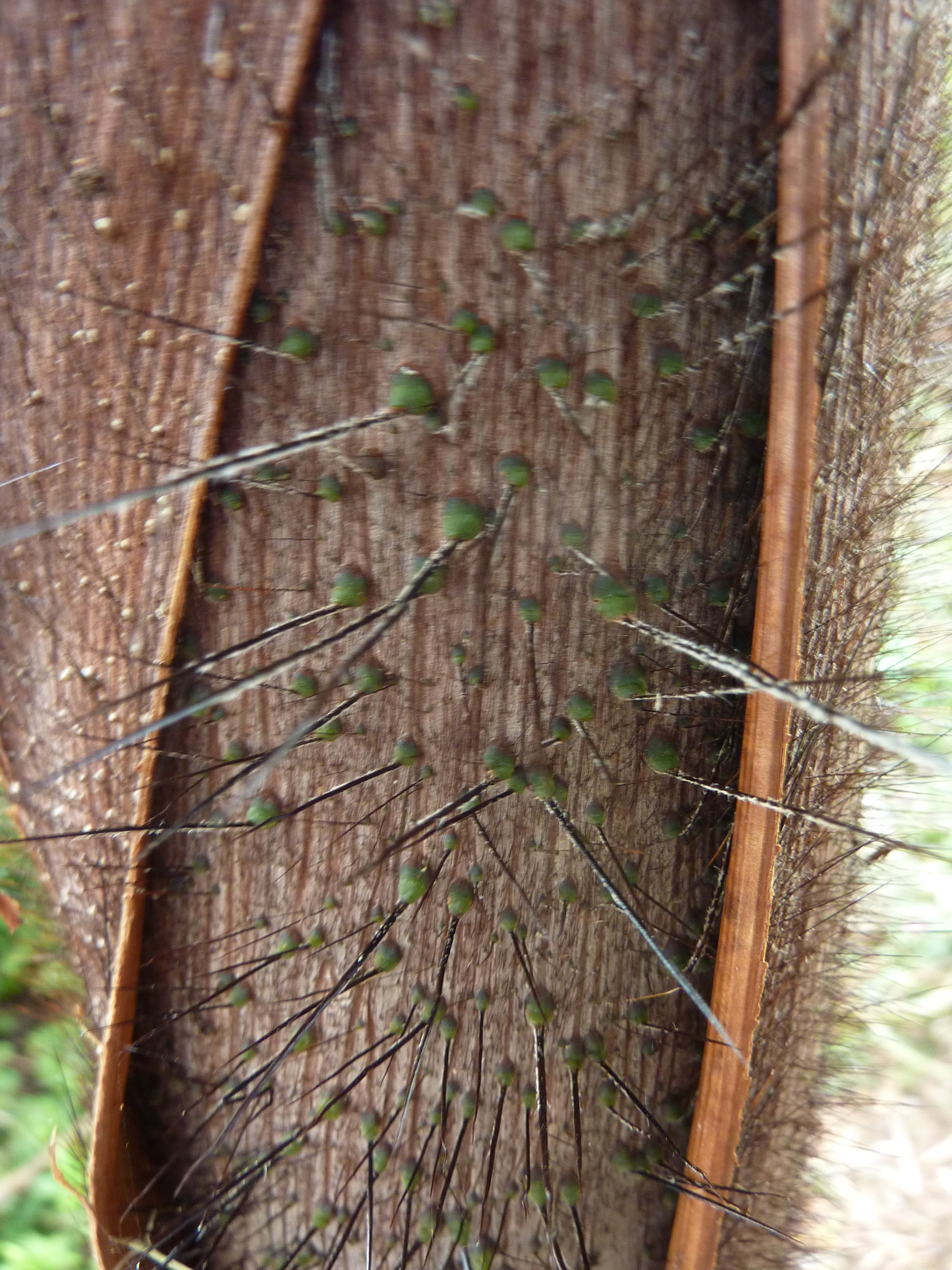
Detail of the leaf sheath, showing thorns

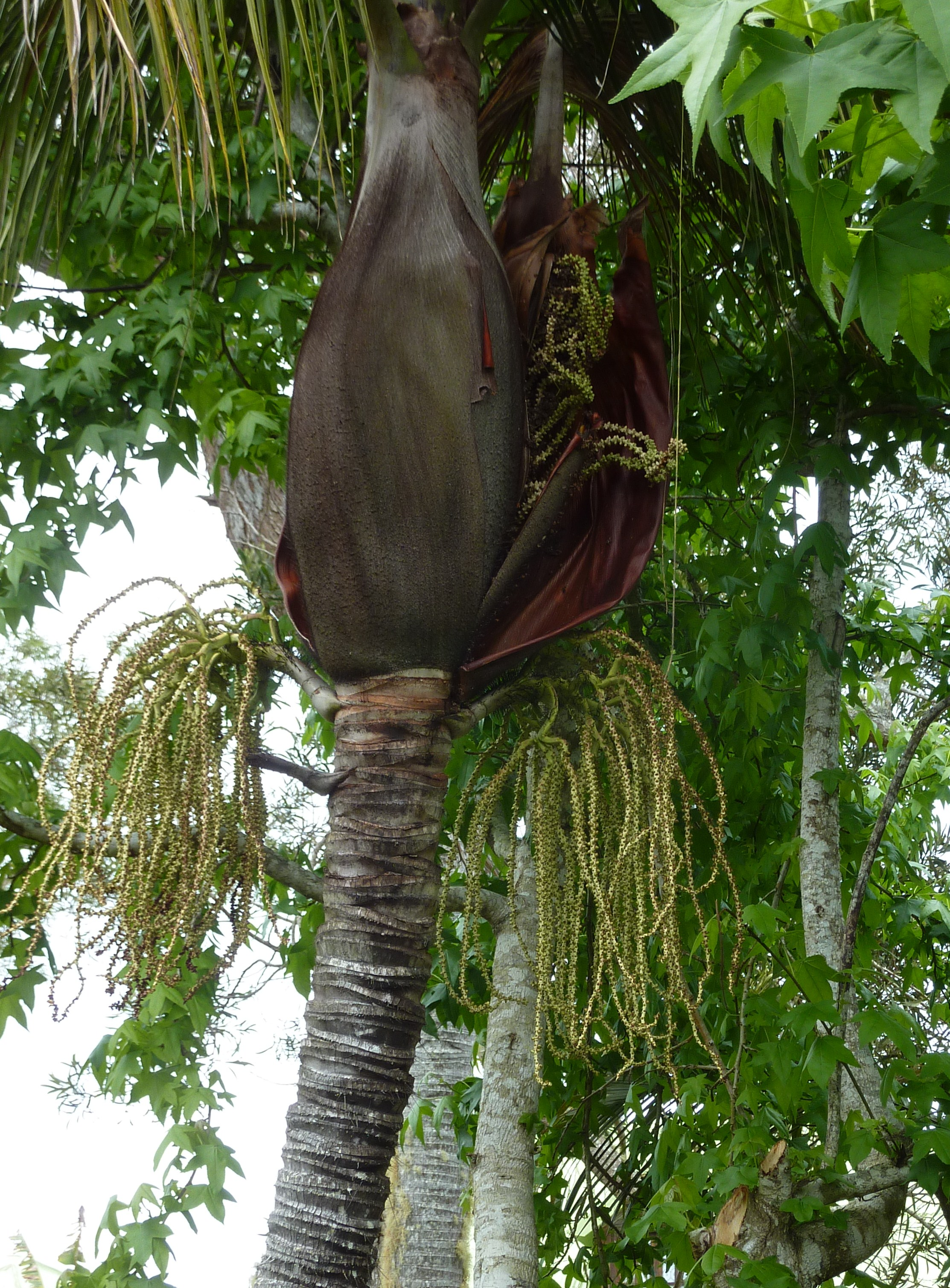
Inflorescence
