= Apis karinjodian =

Indian black honey bee

Conservation status
- Near Threatened (IUCN 3.1)

Scientific classification
- Kingdom: Animalia
- Phylum: Arthropoda
- Clade: Pancrustacea
- Class: Insecta
- Order: Hymenoptera
- Family: Apidae
- Genus: Apis
- Species: A. karinjodian

Binomial name
- Apis karinjodian Shanas et al, 2022

Species of bee

Apis karinjodian, the Indian black honey bee, is a species of genus Apis which was reported recently from India. The currently known distribution of A. karinjodian covers nearly the entire Central to Southern Western Ghats, where it is endemic, and includes the ghat regions in the states of Kerala, Tamilnadu, Karnataka and Goa. The original paper discovering and describing this species also proposes that A. indica and A. cerana are distinct species, thus raising the total number of known cavity-nesting Honeybees in the Indian subcontinent to three, whereas before, A. indica was considered a subspecies of A. cerana.

The researchers hope that the ability of A. karinjodian to produce higher quality honey will positively impact the apiculture industry of India. This species considered as near-threatened species as per the IUCN Red List.
