= Oncosperma platyphyllum =

Conservation status
- Critically Endangered (IUCN 3.1)

Scientific classification
- Kingdom: Plantae
- Clade: Tracheophytes
- Clade: Angiosperms
- Clade: Monocots
- Clade: Commelinids
- Order: Arecales
- Family: Arecaceae
- Genus: Oncosperma
- Species: O. platyphyllum

Binomial name
- Oncosperma platyphyllum Becc.

Species of palm

Oncosperma platyphyllum is a species of flowering plant in the family Arecaceae. It is found only in the Philippines.
