= Gestronella =

Scientific classification
- Kingdom: Animalia
- Phylum: Arthropoda
- Clade: Pancrustacea
- Class: Insecta
- Order: Coleoptera
- Suborder: Polyphaga
- Infraorder: Cucujiformia
- Family: Chrysomelidae
- Subfamily: Cassidinae
- Tribe: Cryptonychini
- Genus: Gestronella; Weise, 1911

Genus of leaf beetles

Gestronella is a genus of beetles belonging to the family Chrysomelidae.

== Species ==
- Gestronella centrolineata (Fairmaire, 1890)
- Gestronella convexicollis (Fairmaire, 1897)
- Gestronella latirostris (Gestro, 1909)
- Gestronella lugubris (Fairmaire, 1890)
- Gestronella obtusicollis (Fairmaire, 1897)
- Gestronella valida (Fairmaire, 1897)
