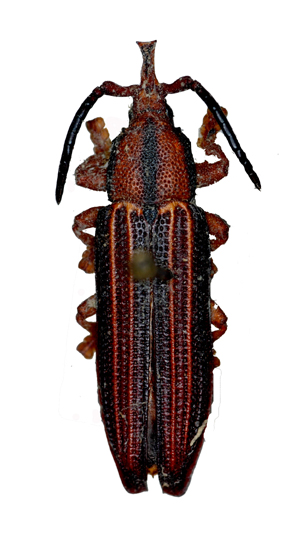

Scientific classification
- Kingdom: Animalia
- Phylum: Arthropoda
- Clade: Pancrustacea
- Class: Insecta
- Order: Coleoptera
- Suborder: Polyphaga
- Infraorder: Cucujiformia
- Family: Chrysomelidae
- Genus: Gestronella
- Species: G. latirostris

Binomial name
- Gestronella latirostris (Gestro, 1909)

Synonyms
- Xiphispa latirostris Gestro, 1909

= Gestronella latirostris =

Species of beetle

Gestronella latirostris is a species of beetle of the family Chrysomelidae. It is found in Madagascar.

== Life history ==
No host plant has been documented for this species.
