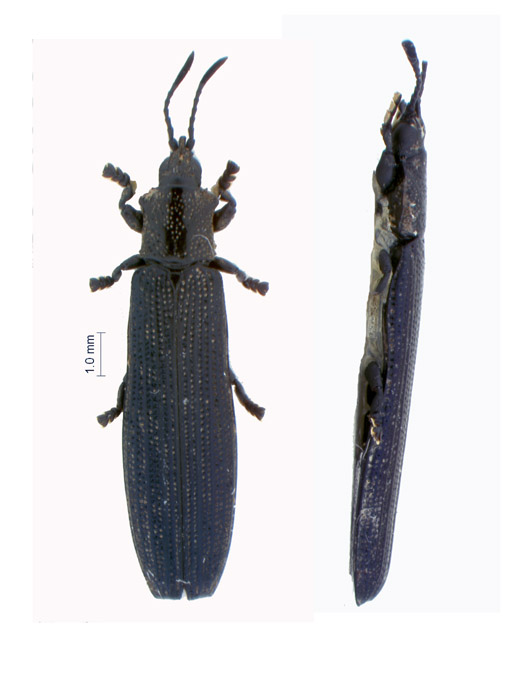

Scientific classification
- Kingdom: Animalia
- Phylum: Arthropoda
- Clade: Pancrustacea
- Class: Insecta
- Order: Coleoptera
- Suborder: Polyphaga
- Infraorder: Cucujiformia
- Family: Chrysomelidae
- Genus: Gestronella
- Species: G. lugubris

Binomial name
- Gestronella lugubris (Fairmaire, 1890)

Synonyms
- Xiphispa lugubris Fairmaire, 1890

= Gestronella lugubris =

Species of beetle

Gestronella lugubris is a species of beetle of the family Chrysomelidae. It is found in Madagascar.

== Life history ==
The recorded host plant for this species is Cocos nucifera.
