= Oncosperma fasciculatum =

Conservation status
- Near Threatened (IUCN 2.3)

Scientific classification
- Kingdom: Plantae
- Clade: Tracheophytes
- Clade: Angiosperms
- Clade: Monocots
- Clade: Commelinids
- Order: Arecales
- Family: Arecaceae
- Genus: Oncosperma
- Species: O. fasciculatum

Binomial name
- Oncosperma fasciculatum Thwaites

Species of palm

Oncosperma fasciculatum is a species of flowering plant in the family Arecaceae. It is found only in Sri Lanka. It is threatened by habitat loss.
