= Gestronella convexicollis =

Scientific classification
- Kingdom: Animalia
- Phylum: Arthropoda
- Clade: Pancrustacea
- Class: Insecta
- Order: Coleoptera
- Suborder: Polyphaga
- Infraorder: Cucujiformia
- Family: Chrysomelidae
- Genus: Gestronella
- Species: G. convexicollis

Binomial name
- Gestronella convexicollis (Fairmaire, 1897)

Synonyms
- Xiphispa convexicollis Fairmaire, 1897

Species of beetle

Gestronella convexicollis is a species of beetle of the family Chrysomelidae. It is found in Madagascar.

== Life history ==
No host plant has been documented for this species.
