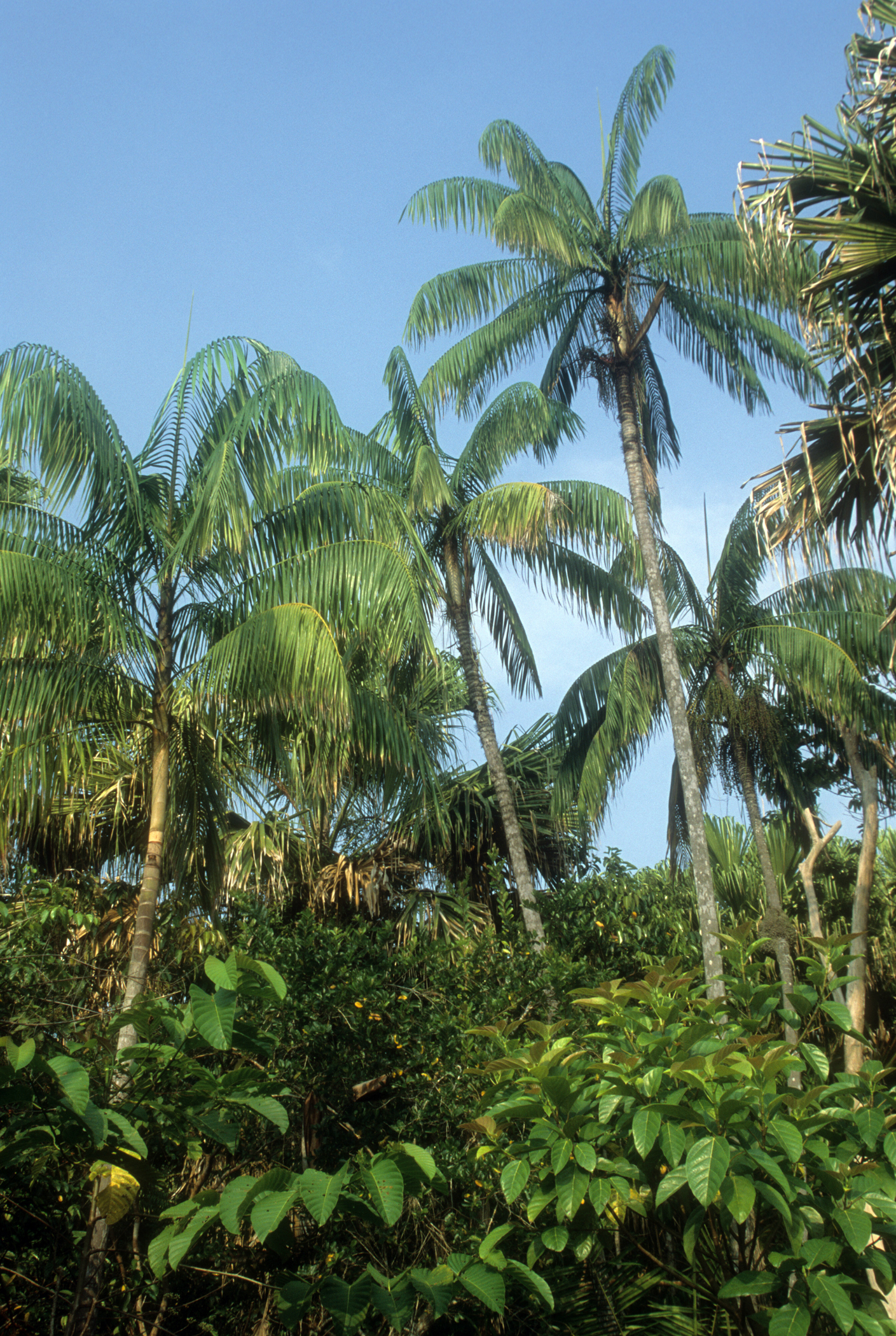
- Oncosperma tigillarium in Malaysia

Scientific classification
- Kingdom: Plantae
- Clade: Tracheophytes
- Clade: Angiosperms
- Clade: Monocots
- Clade: Commelinids
- Order: Arecales
- Family: Arecaceae
- Subfamily: Arecoideae
- Tribe: Areceae
- Subtribe: Oncospermatinae
- Genus: Oncosperma; Blume

Synonyms
- Keppleria Meisn. 1842, illegitimate homonym, not Martius ex Endlicher 1837

= Oncosperma =

Genus of palms

Oncosperma is a genus of flowering plant in the family Arecaceae. It contains the following species, native to Southeast Asia and Sri Lanka:

- Oncosperma fasciculatum Thwaites - Sri Lanka
- Oncosperma gracilipes Becc. - Philippines
- Oncosperma horridum (Griff.) Scheff - Philippines, Thailand, Malaysia, Borneo, Sulawesi, Sumatra
- Oncosperma platyphyllum Becc. - Philippines
- Oncosperma tigillarium (Jack) Ridl. - Thailand, Cambodia, Vietnam, Malaysia, Borneo, Sumatra
