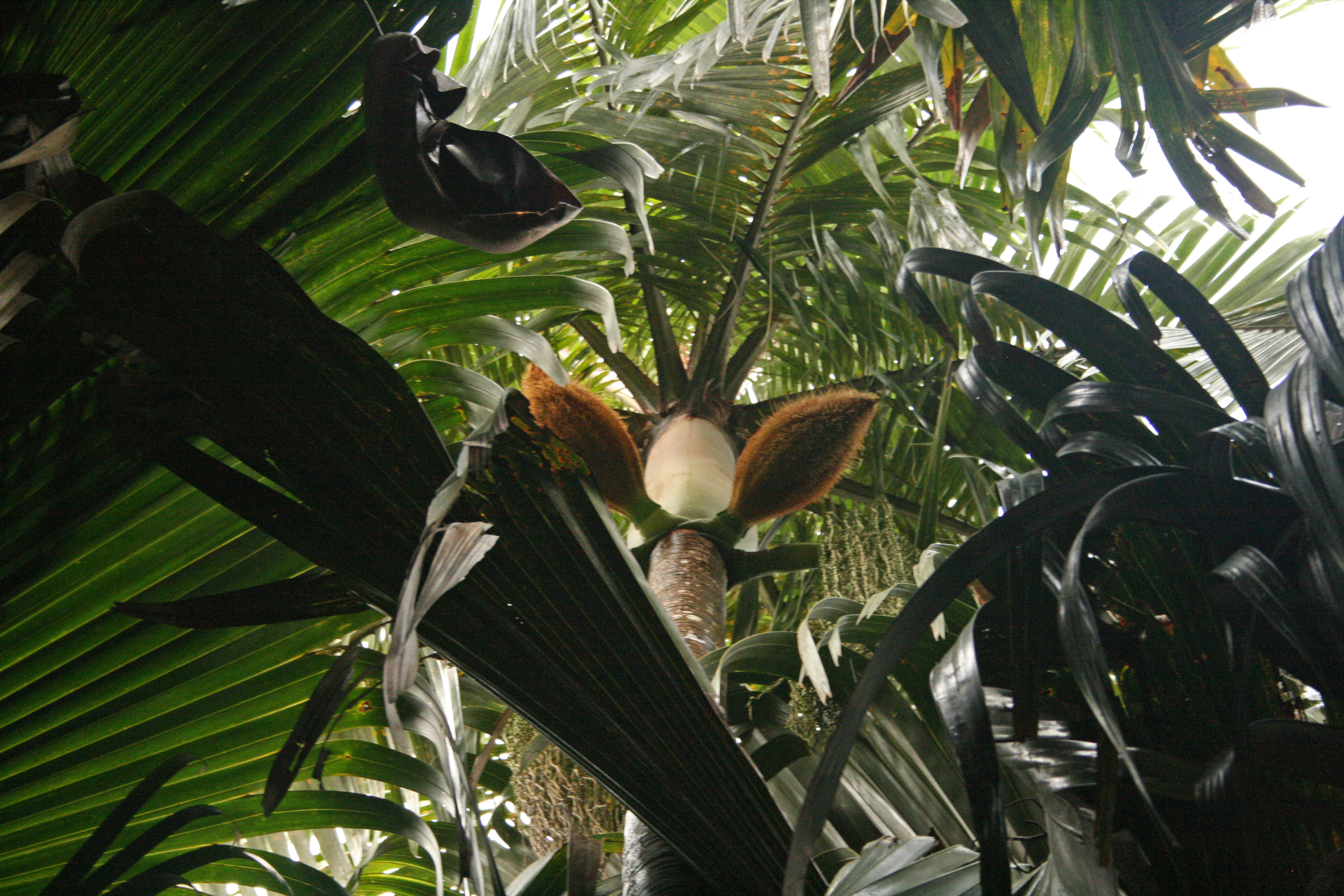
- Deckenia nobilis in Vallee de Mai, Seychelles

Conservation status
- Vulnerable (IUCN 3.1)

Scientific classification
- Kingdom: Plantae
- Clade: Tracheophytes
- Clade: Angiosperms
- Clade: Monocots
- Clade: Commelinids
- Order: Arecales
- Family: Arecaceae
- Subfamily: Arecoideae
- Tribe: Areceae
- Subtribe: Oncospermatinae
- Genus: Deckenia
- Species: D. nobilis

Binomial name
- Deckenia nobilis H.Wendl. ex Seem.

= Deckenia nobilis =

Millionaire's salad

Species of palm

Deckenia nobilis (cabbage palm or millionaire's salad) is a species of flowering plant in the family Arecaceae. It is monotypic within the genus Deckenia, and is endemic to the Seychelles, where it is threatened by habitat loss. It was described in 1870.

== Description ==
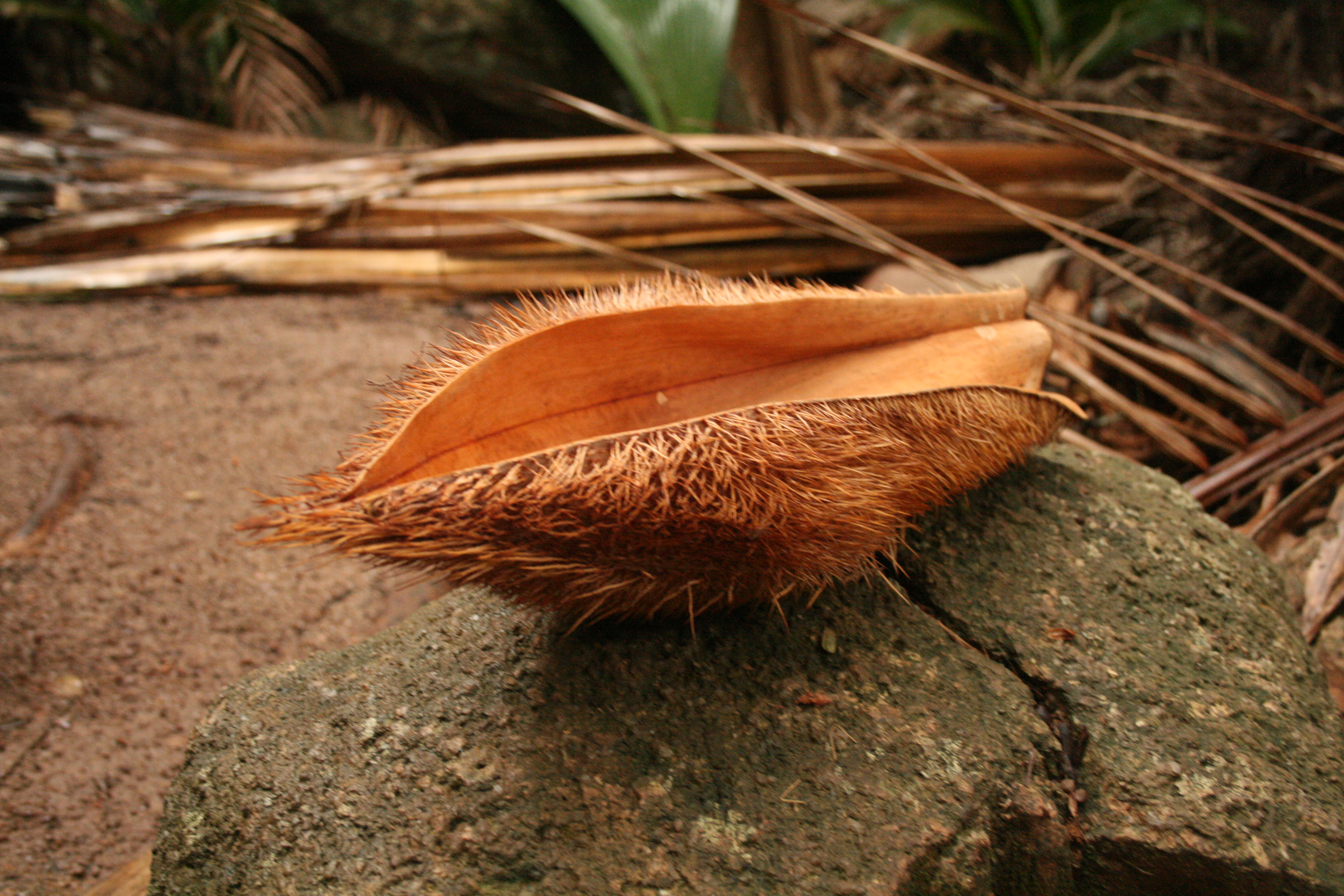
The characteristic spiny fruit

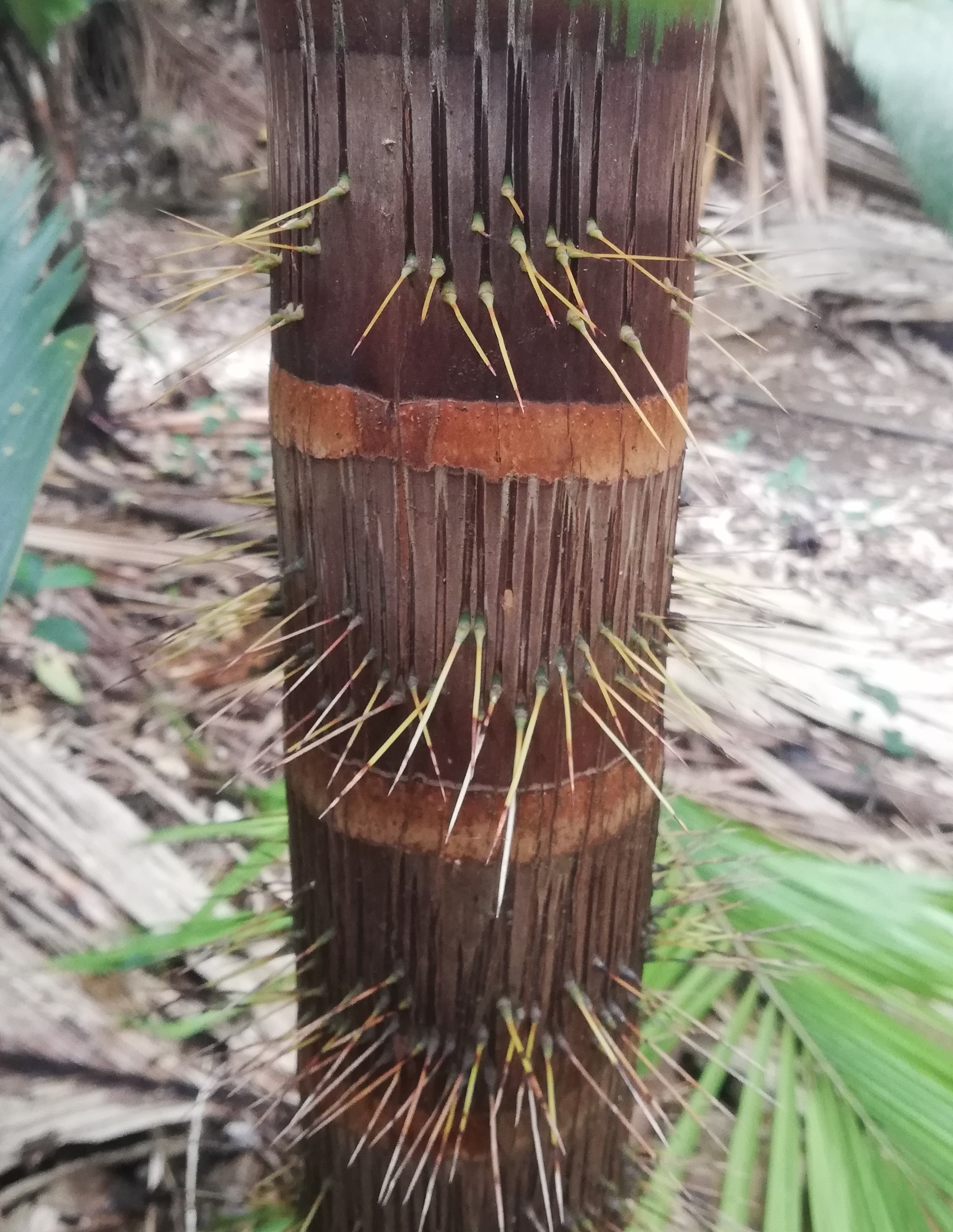
The yellow spines that grow on the trunks of young Deckenia nobilis specimens

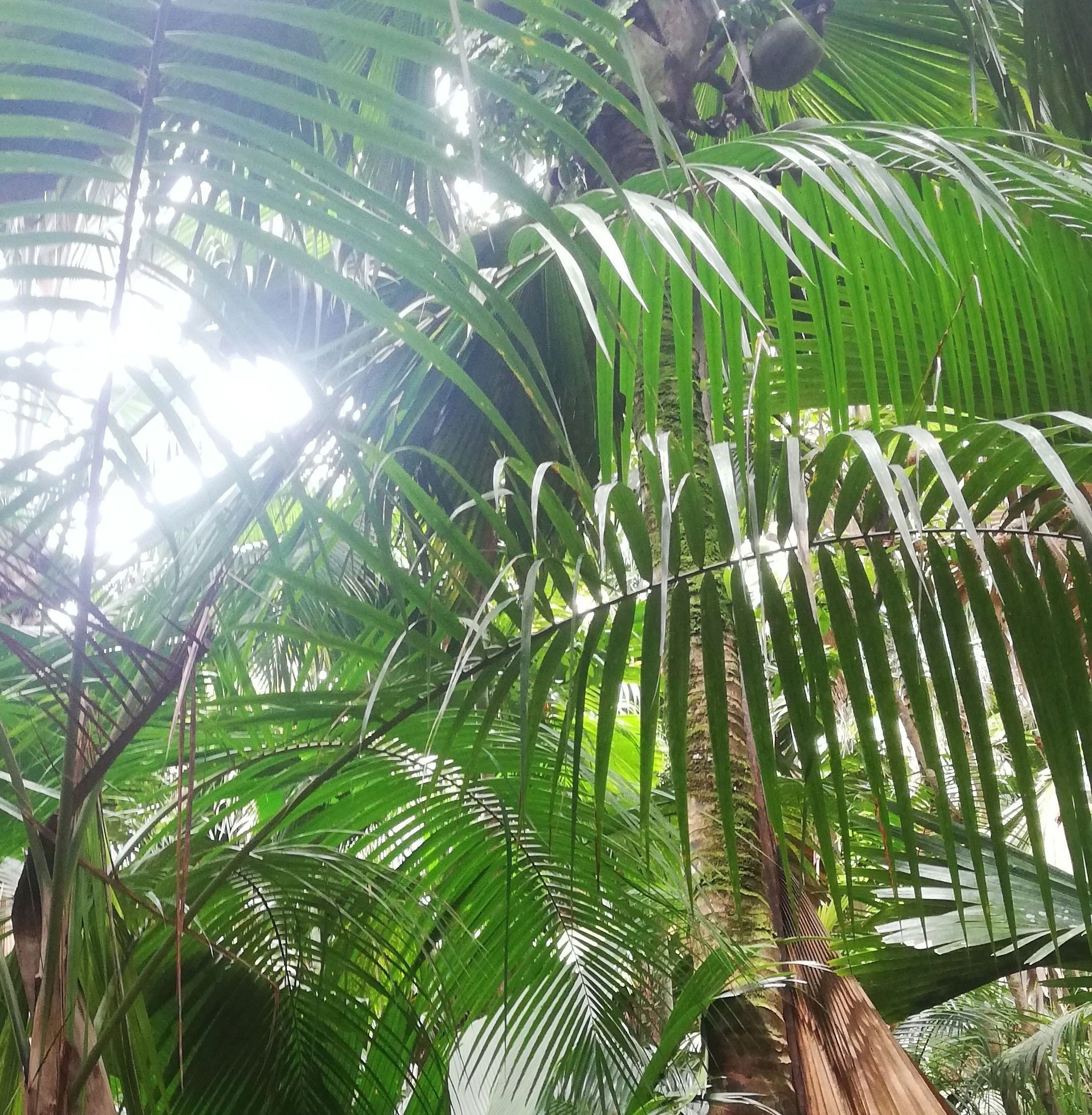
Leaf detail of Deckenia nobilis, growing on Praslin

This species of palm tree has a distinctive spiny fruit, and produces yellow spines on the trunks of young specimens. Adults reach a height of 40 meters.

== Distribution and habitat ==
Deckenia nobilis is endemic to the Seychelles. In the wild, it is found intermittently in lowland forests, at elevations up to 600 metres.

It is in decline due to unregulated or illegal over-harvesting of the edible palm hearts, but certain stands growing on rocky crags and outcrops are very difficult for humans to reach, which tentatively affords them natural protection. Also, some new growth is attributable to tree nurseries on the Seychelles, which raise D. nobilis seedlings and distribute them to the local populace for planting.
