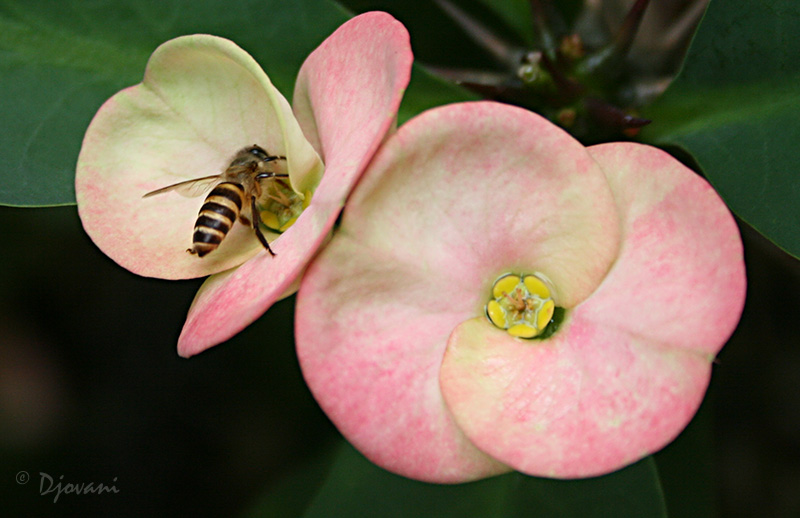

Scientific classification
- Kingdom: Animalia
- Phylum: Arthropoda
- Clade: Pancrustacea
- Class: Insecta
- Order: Hymenoptera
- Family: Apidae
- Genus: Apis
- Species: A. cerana
- Subspecies: A. c. indica

Trinomial name
- Apis cerana indica (Fabricius, 1798)

= Apis cerana indica =

Subspecies of bee

Apis cerana indica, the Indian honey bee, is a subspecies of Asiatic honey bee. It is one of the predominant bees found and domesticated in India, Pakistan, Nepal, Myanmar, Bangladesh, Sri Lanka, Thailand and mainland Asia. Relatively non-aggressive and rarely exhibiting swarming behavior, it is ideal for beekeeping.

It is similar to the European honeybee (Apis mellifera), which tends to be slightly larger and can be easily distinguished.

They usually build multiple combed nests in tree hollows and man-made structures. These bees can adapt to living in purpose-made hives and cavities. Their nesting habit means that they can potentially colonize temperate or mountain areas with prolonged winters or cold temperatures. Colonies contain only a few thousand workers, compared to the 50,000 typical of European honey bees.

It is one of the important pollinators for coconut palms; the other species are Apis florea, Apis dorsata and Apis mellifera (the European bee).

A recent paper describing the discovery of Apis karinjodian, a species of cavity-nesting honeybee endemic to the Western Ghats region of India, also proposes that A. Indica is a distinct species from A. Cerana, and that its homeland of Southern India may also be the center of origin for the European honeybee, Apis mellifera.

== Sources ==
- Oldroyd, Benjamin P.; Wongsiri, Siriwat (2006). Asian Honey Bees (Biology, Conservation, and Human Interactions). Cambridge, Massachusetts and London, England: Harvard University Press.
- Tautz, J.; Lindauer, M. (1997). "Honeybees establish specific nest sites on the comb for their waggle dances". Journal of Comparative Physiology. 180: 537–539.
