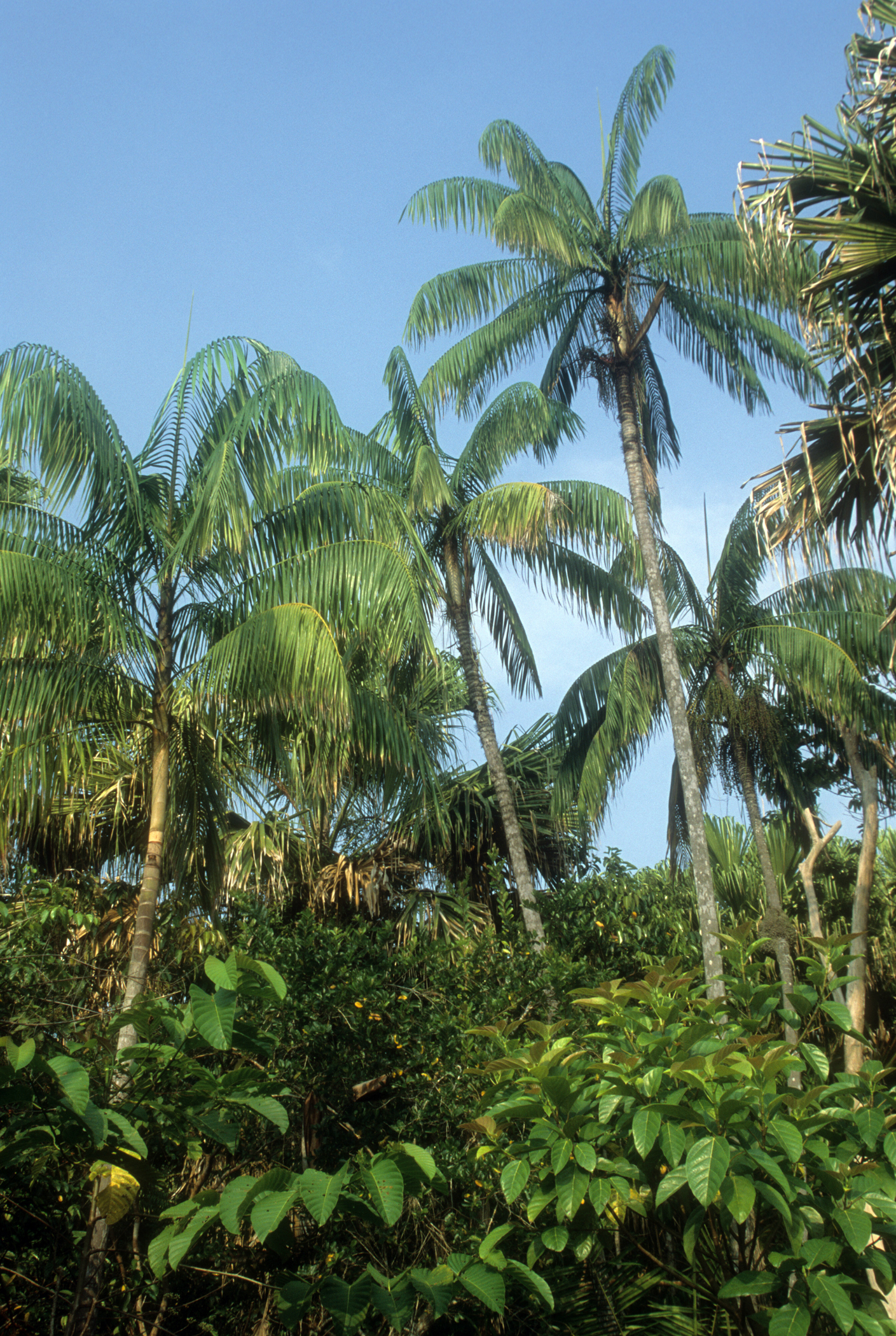
- Oncosperma tigillarium in Malaysia
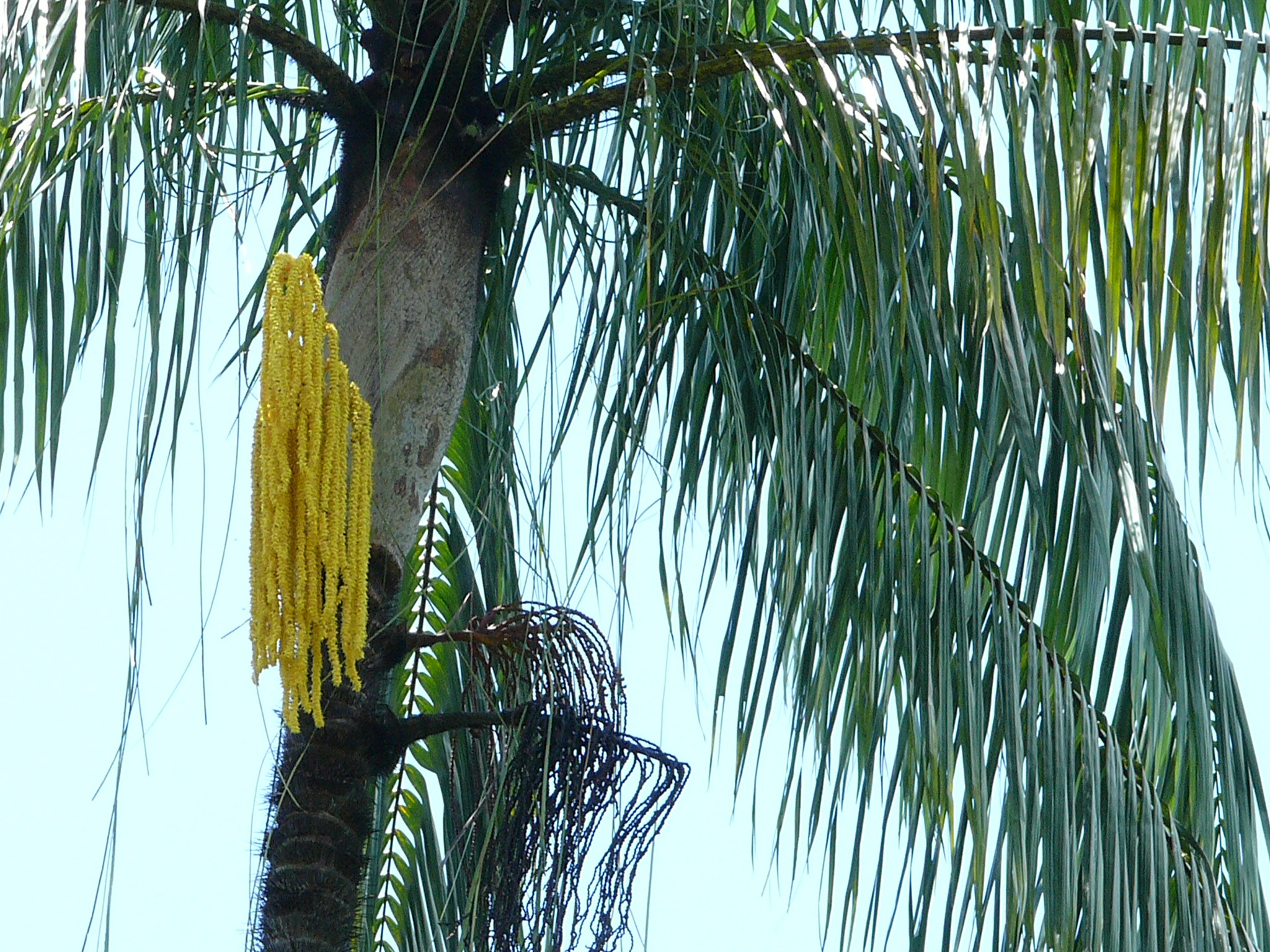
- fruiting frond

Conservation status
- Least Concern (IUCN 3.1)

Scientific classification
- Kingdom: Plantae
- Clade: Tracheophytes
- Clade: Angiosperms
- Clade: Monocots
- Clade: Commelinids
- Order: Arecales
- Family: Arecaceae
- Genus: Oncosperma
- Species: O. tigillarium

Binomial name
- Oncosperma tigillarium (Jack) Ridl.

Synonyms
- Areca tigillaria Jack; Keppleria tigillaria (Jack) Meisn.; Areca nibung Mart.; Areca spinosa Hasselt & Kunth; Euterpe filamentosa Kunth; Oncosperma filamentosum (Kunth) Blume; Oncosperma cambodianum Hance

= Oncosperma tigillarium =

Species of palm tree

Oncosperma tigillarium, commonly known as Nibong palm is an Asian species of palm tree in the family Arecaceae.

== Description ==
Oncosperma tigillarium grows to 12m (possibly up to 30m) in height in dense thickets of up to 50 palm trees. The trunks of the palms are covered with long black spines. Oncosperma tigilarium has finely pinnate leaves, with drooping leaflets.

== Common names ==
Its common name in Indonesian is nibung meaning thorn, for the long thorns that arise along the length of the trunk of the palm. In parts of the Philippines it is known as anibung in the Hiligaynon language. In Khmer it is called sla: ta 'aôn

== Distribution ==
The species is known from inland, lower salinity waters, near mangrove swamps of southern Vietnam, Cambodia, the Philippines, Malaysia and Indonesia, in Southeast Asia. It is native to these areas west of the Wallace Line growing at elevations below 150 metres. It is endangered in some areas due to deforestation, and it is invasive to a few tropical islands in the Western Hemisphere where it has been planted as an ornamental.

== Habitat and ecology ==
In Singapore, a cluster of Nibong palms survive near the entrance of the Istana, located at the end of Orchard Road. A plaque at that site states: "As the nibong is a mangrove palm, this site must have once been a mangrove swamp." The species is a close relative of Oncosperma horridum and shares with it properties of seawater-resistance in its stems, making it useful in the construction of kelongs, wooden structures used in shallow seas for the catching or cultivation of fish.

== Uses ==
In Cambodia, the black, very hard wood is used for pickets in dams, the manufacture of boards and as ribs in umbrellas. The green fruit may replace Areca nut in the betel quid.

The leaf buds are edible.
