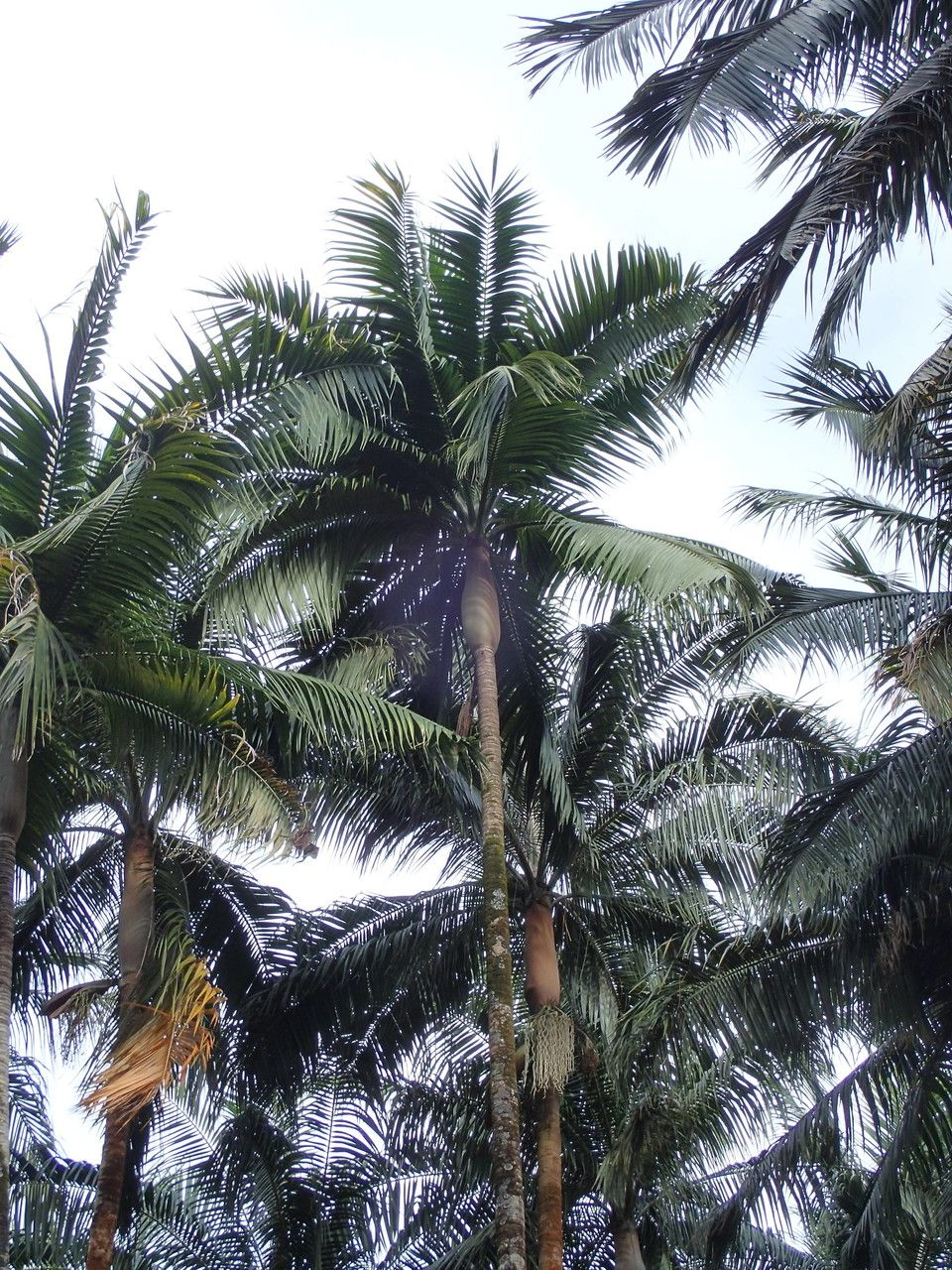

Conservation status
- Critically Endangered (IUCN 2.3)

Scientific classification
- Kingdom: Plantae
- Clade: Tracheophytes
- Clade: Angiosperms
- Clade: Monocots
- Clade: Commelinids
- Order: Arecales
- Family: Arecaceae
- Genus: Acanthophoenix
- Species: A. rubra

Binomial name
- Acanthophoenix rubra (Bory) H.Wendl.

Synonyms
- Areca cincta Walp.; Areca herbstii W.Watson; Areca rubra Bory (1804) (basionym); Calamus dealbatus W.Bull; Calamus verschaffeltii W.Bull ex J.Dix (1861); Calamus verschaffeltii H.Wendl. (1878), not validly publ.; Sublimia centennina Comm. ex Mart.

= Acanthophoenix rubra =

Species of palm

Acanthophoenix rubra, the barbel palm, is a critically endangered palm endemic to Mauritius, Rodrigues, and Réunion that is prized for its edible palm hearts.

== Naming and description ==
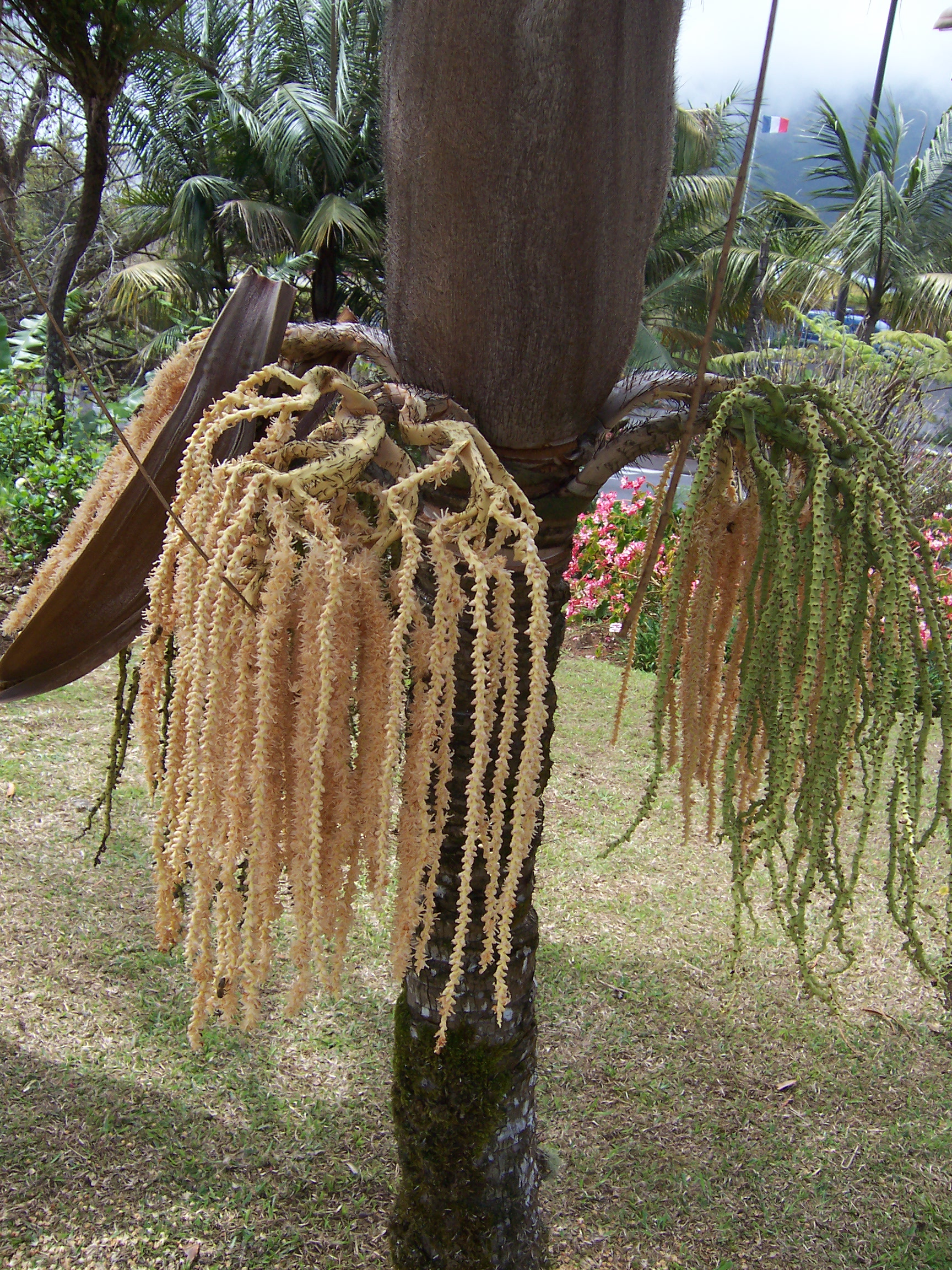
Details of flowers

It is also known as the red- or yellow- Barbel palm, red palm, Mascarene Islands cabbage palm, and palmiste rouge, palmiste bourre, palmiste des bois, palmiste des hauts, palmiste épineux, palmiste zépines, palmiste piquant in French.

This palm was first described as Areca rubra by French naturalist Jean Baptiste Bory de Saint-Vincent in 1804 and classified by German botanist Hermann Wendland in its own genus Acanthophoenix in 1867. It can reach a height of 25 m. The trunk is slender, with a diameter of 18 cm. The crown contents of about 10 leaves approximately 3 m in size which are arranged convoluted.

In his 1995 checklist of seed plants, Rafaël Govaerts considered A. crinita to be a synonym of Acanthophoenix rubra, as did Govaerts and John Dransfield in their 2005 checklist of palms. However, in his revision of the genus, N. Ludwig recognised A. crinita as a separate species.

== Threats ==
The Barbel palm is endangered due to habitat destruction to make way for sugarcane plantations, and its high value as edible and medicinal plant. The palm heart is a delicacy. About 150 individuals occur in the wild on Mauritius. It is widely grown in cultivation.

== Synonyms ==
- Areca rubra Bory (1804).
