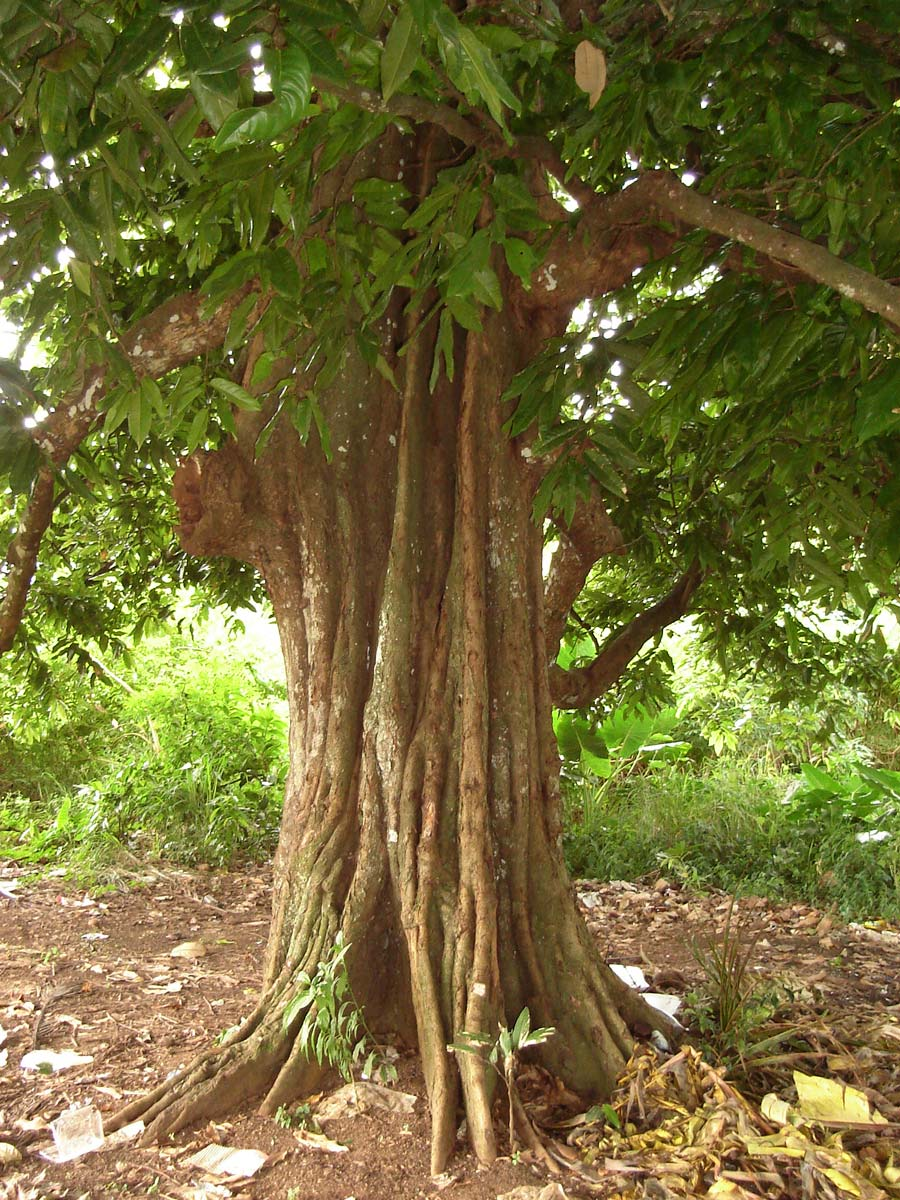
- Inocarpus fagifer

Scientific classification
- Kingdom: Plantae
- Clade: Embryophytes
- Clade: Tracheophytes
- Clade: Spermatophytes
- Clade: Angiosperms
- Clade: Eudicots
- Clade: Rosids
- Order: Fabales
- Family: Fabaceae
- Subfamily: Faboideae
- Tribe: Dalbergieae
- Genus: Inocarpus; J.R.Forst. & G.Forst. (1776)

Species
- Inocarpus ademanus W.N.Takeuchi; Inocarpus fagifer (Parkinson ex F.A.Zorn) Fosberg; Inocarpus glabellus Adema; Inocarpus papuanus Kosterm.

Synonyms
- Aniotum Sol ex. Parkinson (1773); Renia Noronha (1790), nom. nud.

= Inocarpus =

Genus of legumes

Inocarpus is a small genus of flowering plants belonging to the subfamily Faboideae of the legume family, Fabaceae, and was recently assigned to the informal monophyletic Pterocarpus clade within the Dalbergieae.

== Species ==
Inocarpus comprises four species distributed in Malesia and the South Pacific.

- Inocarpus ademanus W.N.Takeuchi – eastern New Guinea
- Inocarpus fagifer (Parkinson ex Zollinger) Fosberg — Tahitian chestnut – Malesia, Papuasia, and the South Pacific
- Inocarpus glabellus Adema – eastern New Guinea
- Inocarpus papuanus Kostermans – eastern New Guinea and the Bismarck Archipelago
