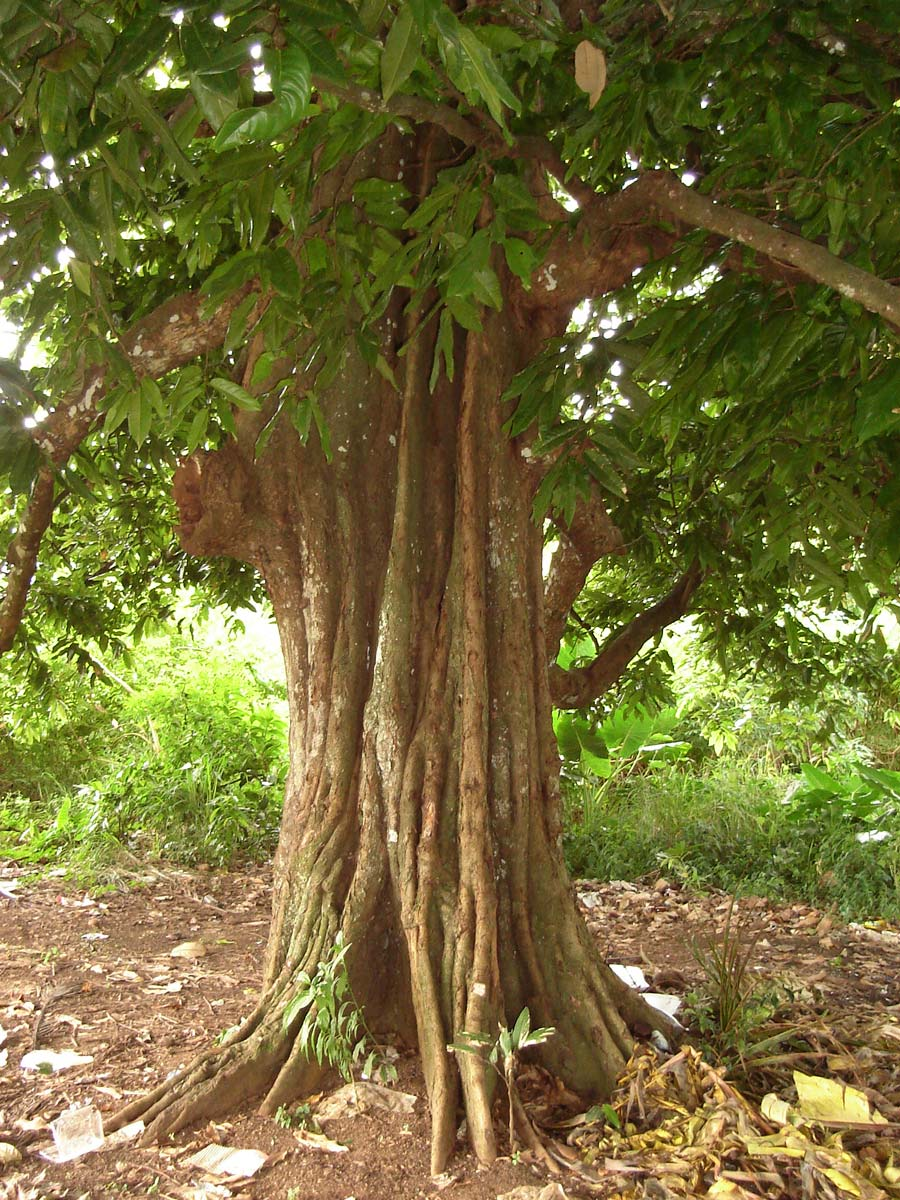

Conservation status
- Least Concern (IUCN 3.1)

Scientific classification
- Kingdom: Plantae
- Clade: Tracheophytes
- Clade: Angiosperms
- Clade: Eudicots
- Clade: Rosids
- Order: Fabales
- Family: Fabaceae
- Subfamily: Faboideae
- Genus: Inocarpus
- Species: I. fagifer

Binomial name
- Inocarpus fagifer (Parkinson ex Zollinger) Fosberg, 1941

Synonyms
- Aniotum fagiferum Parkinson; Bocoa edulis (J. R. Forst. & G. Forst.) Baill.; Cajanus edulis (J. R. Forst. & G. Forst.) Kuntze; Inocarpus edulis J. R. Forst. & G. Forst.; Inocarpus fagiferus (Park.) Fosb.

= Inocarpus fagifer =

Species of plant

Inocarpus fagifer, commonly known as the Tahitian chestnut or Polynesian chestnut, is a species of flowering plant in the subfamily Faboideae of the legume family, Fabaceae. The tree has a wide range in the tropics of the south-west Pacific and south-east Asian regions, and a history of traditional use by the peoples of Polynesia and Melanesia. It is the only edible and culturally important member of the genus Inocarpus.

== Description ==
There is great diversity in the size, form, shape and colour of the Tahitian chestnut, and of its leaves, flowers and fruit. Because of its long history of cultivation and its tendency to become naturalised where introduced, it is likely that, over its wide range, the species contains several originally farmer-selected cultivars that have not been recognised or described.

The Tahitian chestnut is a medium-sized, evergreen tropical tree. It may grow to 30 m in height, though 20 m is more usual, with a crown diameter of 4–6 m. Mature tree trunks have a typical diameter at breast height of 300 mm, although some grow to a diameter of 900 mm. The trunks are distinctively buttressed at the base and fluted. The branches are arranged spirally, with secondary branching forming a dense network within the canopy. The bark is rough, flaky and brown, becoming greyer with age. From the buttresses a dense network of lateral roots extends through the topsoil around the tree, which has only a shallow taproot. It has a lifespan of 80–90 years.

The dark green leaves are simple, oblong, alternate, and leathery. They are 160–390 mm long and 70–130 mm wide. The petiole is 5 mm long. The apex is pointed and the base lobed, with an entire margin. The veins are opposite and yellow.

The fragrant flowers cluster along a short rachis at the ends of the branches and twigs. About 10 mm long, they have five white to cream or pale yellow petals. Trees begin flowering at 3 to 5 years old, with the flowering season usually taking place in November and December, and fruiting in the following January and February, though this varies through the tree's range and from year to year.

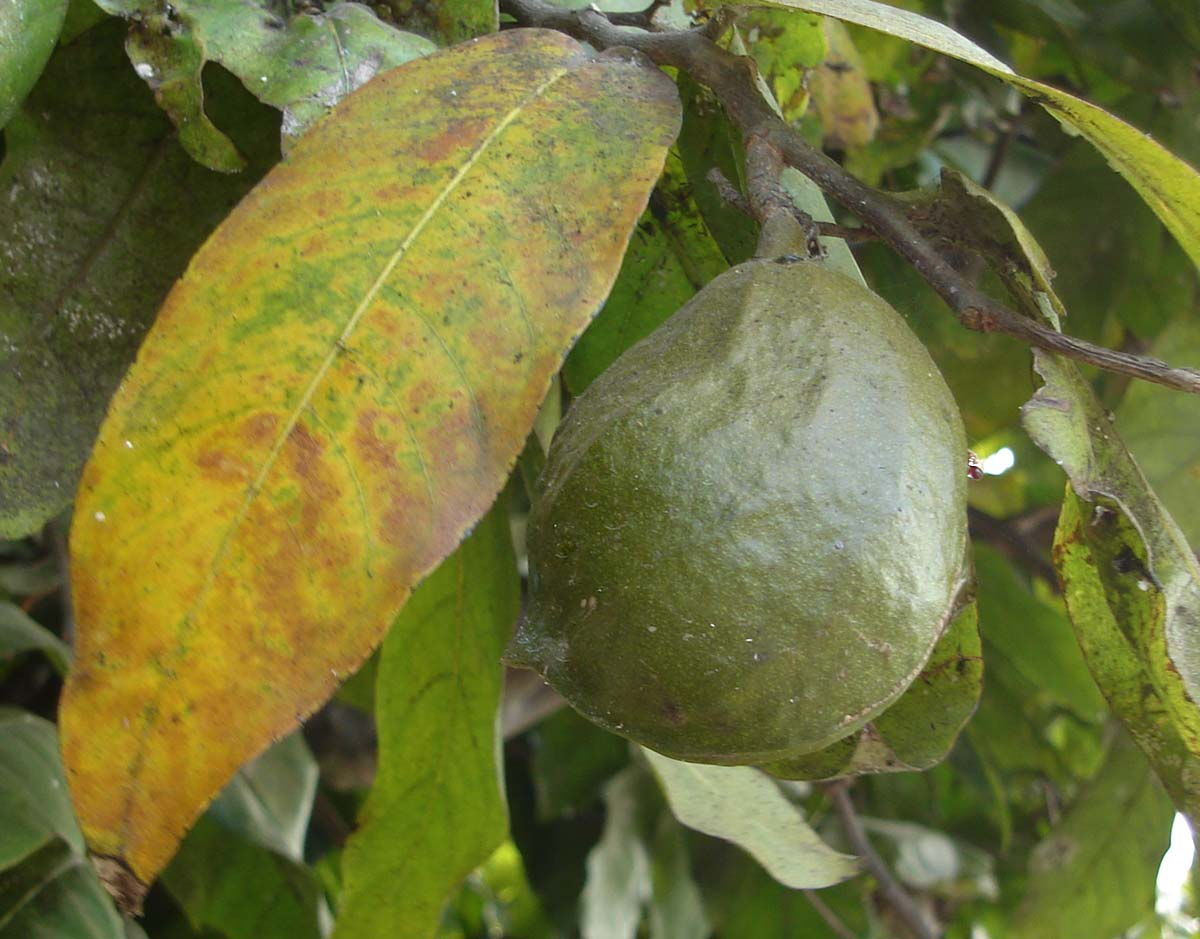
Fruit

The tree starts bearing fruit at about eight years old. The fruits are slightly flattened, irregularly ovoid, rounded or oblong, and flanged at one end. Produced singly or in clusters, they weigh 50–110 g and are 46–130 mm long, 34–120 mm wide, and 40 mm thick. The smooth skin covers a fibrous shell that holds the kernel. As the fruits ripen their colour changes from green to yellow or orange brown. The mature fruits are usually indehiscent.

The seed is white and kidney-shaped and is contained within the thin brown, fibrous shell. It is relatively large, weighing 5–50 g, 20–70 mm long by 16–40 mm wide. The seed is toxic when raw but edible when cooked. It is perishable, with a short shelf life. The fleshy mesocarp, or pulp, of the fruit is eaten by cockatoos and flying foxes, which act as seed dispersal agents.

== Distribution and habitat ==
The Tahitian chestnut grows in the humid lowland tropics with a moderate to high, uniformly distributed or mainly summer rainfall of 1,500–4,300 mm (59–169 in) annually, at altitudes ranging from 0–500 m (0–1,640 ft). It grows in a wide range of soils, including those that are highly calcareous and saline, poorly drained to waterlogged, or those with medium to very low fertility, as well as in mildly acidic to very alkaline coastal soils.

The tree was evidently cultivated more intensively in the past, as it has become extensively naturalised, and is now found mainly in the wild. Its distribution spreads from Malaysia in the west across Melanesia, north-eastern Australia and Micronesia, to the Marquesas of Polynesia in the east. It is commonly found in secondary forest, along the edges of old gardens, riverbanks, in swamps, coastal areas, coconut plantations and mangroves.

== Uses ==
The tree has a wide variety of traditional uses, exploiting almost every part of the plant. The leaves and bark have found uses in herbal medicine, in Fiji the ivi leaves also are one of the traditional materials for thatching the bure, fallen branches serve as firewood, green wood is burned to dry copra, and the timber is used for crafts such as carvings and tool handles, as well as for building canoes and for general light construction. Young ivi leaves are used to cover food in the traditional lovo oven.

The fleshy mesocarp is inedible for humans, but the seed kernels serve as an important indigenous food in many island countries in the Pacific. The kernel has a protein content of about 5% and carbohydrate content of 22%, and needs to be cooked to make it edible. Methods of preparation include roasting, grilling, boiling and baking. In Papua New Guinea, the Solomon Islands, Vanuatu, Fiji and in Polynesia the cooked kernels are often mashed into a pudding.

The tree has uses in agroforestry in coastal and soil stabilisation, as an overstorey for crops needing shade, such as cocoa, and as a windbreak. The main products are the edible kernels and the timber. Trees over 25 years old can produce up to 75 kg of fruit a year.

== Mythology ==
Examples of local folklore about the tree:

- It was believed in Samoa that humans originated from the Tahitian chestnut tree.
- In Vanuatu the first woman was a man who had been emasculated by having the hot leaves applied to his genitals.
- On Choiseul Island in the Solomons, a man who betrayed a tribal chief was suffocated by the flatulence produced as a result of the people around him eating the cooked kernels.
- In Fiji, there are stories about a now submerged island named Vuniivilevu, meaning large ivi tree.
