= Tectiphiala =

Conservation status
- Critically Endangered (IUCN 2.3)

Scientific classification
- Kingdom: Plantae
- Clade: Tracheophytes
- Clade: Angiosperms
- Clade: Monocots
- Clade: Commelinids
- Order: Arecales
- Family: Arecaceae
- Subfamily: Arecoideae
- Tribe: Areceae
- Subtribe: Oncospermatinae
- Genus: Tectiphiala; H.E.Moore
- Species: T. ferox

Binomial name
- Tectiphiala ferox H.E.Moore

Genus of palms

Tectiphiala is a monotypic genus of flowering plant in the palm family, Arecaceae. Tectiphiala ferox is the sole species in the genus. It is sometimes referred to by the common name Palmiste bouglé.

It is endemic to Mauritius. It is threatened by habitat loss. Tectiphiala ferox was not known until 1965 when this new species of the Mascarene palm was discovered near Grand Bassin by Marc d"Unienville. Individuals in this species can grow up to 9 meters.
