= Canarium vulgare =

Scientific classification
- Kingdom: Plantae
- Clade: Tracheophytes
- Clade: Angiosperms
- Clade: Eudicots
- Clade: Rosids
- Order: Sapindales
- Family: Burseraceae
- Genus: Canarium
- Species: C. vulgare

Binomial name
- Canarium vulgare Leenh.

Synonyms
- Canarium commune auct. non L.

Species of plant

Canarium vulgare, known as Java almond, is a species of Canarium native to eastern Java Sea (Bawean and Kangean Islands), Lesser Sunda Islands, Sulawesi and Maluku Islands.

C. vulgare is closely related to C. indicum, and they used to be one species under the name Canarium commune L., which has caused much confusion. Their main difference is that the stipule of C. vulgare is entire and caducous, while that of C. indicum is dentate and persistent.
