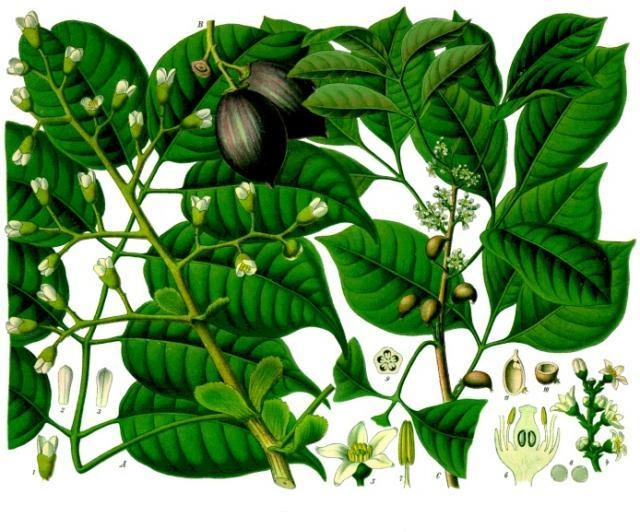

Scientific classification
- Kingdom: Plantae
- Clade: Embryophytes
- Clade: Tracheophytes
- Clade: Spermatophytes
- Clade: Angiosperms
- Clade: Eudicots
- Clade: Rosids
- Order: Sapindales
- Family: Burseraceae
- Genus: Canarium
- Species: C. indicum

Binomial name
- Canarium indicum L.

= Canarium indicum =

Species of flowering plant

Canarium indicum, known as galip nut, is a mainly dioecious tree native in eastern Melanesia. It is usually found in rainforests, secondary forests, old garden areas, around villages and settlements. It is also used as a shade tree, as a windbreak and in agroforestry. Canarium is important in the world food system as it can be used as a food and timber source, in traditional medicine, intercropping and agroforestry.

== Cultivars ==
Canarium indicum has two recognised botanical varieties: indicum and platycerioideum. The latter is uncommon and grows in Indonesia and in West Papua New Guinea. It has larger leaves and fruits than the indicum variety. In Vanuatu, however, there are at least five cultivars known that differ in shape, size, fruit color at maturation and mesocarp color and texture.

== Origin and regions of cultivation ==
Canarium is native in eastern Indonesia, Papua New Guinea, the Solomon Islands, and Vanuatu. Besides Melanesia, it is also cultivated in Fiji, in the north of Australia, Taiwan, Hawaii, Honduras and Trinidad. Usually, it is found in rainforests, secondary forests, old garden areas, around villages and settlements and is also used as a shade tree, as a windbreak and in agroforestry.

Nuts have been important in the diet in Papua New Guinea for about 6,000 years. In 2007, approximately one third of the household grew Canarium. In the Solomon Islands, they are important in traditional society, with the ownership of trees being a measure of wealth.

== Growth ==
=== Development and physiology ===
Canarium indicum is an evergreen, large tree with a fluted, buttressed trunk, heavy lateral branches and a dense canopy. Mature trees are usually 20–30 m (70–100 ft) tall but can grow up to 40 m (130 ft) in height. They naturally grow between 200 and 300 kg/m^{3} in density. Trunk diameter is between 1–1.5 m (3.3–4.9 ft) and can attain 30 m (100 ft) in canopy diameter.

- Leaves are bright green imparipinnate with 3 to 7 jugate. They have an oblong-obovate to oblong-lanceolate leaflet of 7–28 cm (2.8–11.0 in) by 3.5–11 cm (1.4–4.3 in). They are obtusely acuminate with sub-undulating and possess entire margin. Pseudostipules, however, are persistent, large, leafy, ovate and serrate-dentate with fringed margins.
- Canarium flowers are small, around 1 cm (0.4 in) across, yellowish-white and arise in terminal panicles, with deciduous stipule and bract at the flower's base. Moreover, flowers are perianth trimerous with pubescent outer surface and contain 6 joined stamens, free of the perianth. The ovary is superior and has three-loculed with one style. Canarium has large infructescence with up to 30 fruits borne on pendulous pedicels.
- Its fruits are ovoid to elliptic-oblong. They measure 3–6 cm (1.2–2.4 in) by 2–3 cm (0.79–1.18 in), generally have a green color and turn to deep dark, black or blue-black when they ripe.
- The nut found in the shell is stony, hard and can be rounded or 3-6 sided in cross section.
- Kernels are usually trigonous, 1 cm across, with brown testa.

The flowering period lasts only about 2 weeks and is followed by a long gestation of 6 to 9 months.

=== Life form ===
In Papua New Guinea and the Solomon Islands, the Canarium is dioecious. In Vanuatu, trees may also grow either hermaphrodite flowers plus female flowers, or hermaphrodite flowers plus male flowers.

== Cultivation ==
=== Soil requirements ===
Canarium prefers medium to heavy textured soils like loams, sandy clay loams, clays, clay loams and sandy clays of moderate to high soil fertility. Well-drained to slightly impeded drainage with good organic matter content are favored. A pH of 4.5-6.5 is favoured but it can tolerate pH levels up to 7.4. However, Canarium cannot grow on shallow, infertile or saline soils. Even if young trees need to be partially shaded, adult trees prefer full sun situations but also tolerate 20-70% shade.

=== Seedbed requirements and sowing ===
Seedlings should be planted into well prepared holes in which topsoil and organic matter is incorporated. The suggested spacing for nut-used trees is 9–10 m (30–33 ft) by 9–10 m (30–33 ft). Best germination rates are achieved when seeds are depulped by removal of the mesocarp, planted soon after harvesting and placed 10 mm (0.39 in) deep in light soils (sand and peat or topsoil).

=== Climate requirements ===
Canarium is mainly found in wet lowland areas of subhumid to humid tropics. Mean annual temperatures of 15–28 °C (59–82 °F), mean maximum temperature of the hottest month of 29–32 °C (84–90 °F) and mean minimum temperature of the coldest month of 17–24 °C (63–75 °F) are preferred. Canarium can also grow in sub-tropical regions with temperatures from 17–25 °C (63–77 °F). However, it is sensitive to temperatures below 5–7 °C (41–45 °F) and frost. Trees mainly grow from sea level to 250 m (820 ft), but may be planted up 600 m (2,000 ft). In the wild, it is found up to 100 m (330 ft) above sea level. Mean annual rainfall should be 1,800–4,000 mm (71–157 in), with an optimum range 2,500–3,500 mm (98–138 in), preferably with summer or uniform annual rainfall. Annual precipitations of 6,000 mm (240 in) can still be tolerated. A dry season with less than 40 mm (1.6 in) should only last 0–1 months. Canarium can thus survive short drought periods, but also strong winds and salt sprays.

=== Cultivation management & fertilization ===
Ground cover should be regularly slashed or mown to minimize competition with trees as seedlings best survive under intermediate light levels. New-plantations should therefore be regularly weeded. Trees might also be planted in secondary and primary forest that are progressively thinned to allow more light to reach the seedlings.

Fertilizer applications of 360 g urea (N), 150 g super phosphate (P) and 240 g muriate of potash (K) per tree per year is recommended for the first 10 years. After this, the rate per tree should be increased proportionally to the size of the tree and applied as several applications evenly distributed throughout the year.

=== Pests and diseases ===
Canarium appears not to be highly susceptible to damage by any particular pest or disease. Canarium cultivation has produced various cultivars with inherent pest and disease resistance, which could be used in breeding programs. The hard and non-perishable shell protects kernels from vermin and pathogens.

== Yield ==
Fruit consists of an outer skin (exocarp), flesh (mesocarp), nut-in-shell, and edible kernel in testa.

=== Harvest and postharvest treatment ===
Traditionally, the harvesting of Canarium is of great social importance. Rights to harvest individual trees are traded within and amongst clans. Fruits can either be picked up from the ground or harvested directly from the trees. The fruiting season in Papua New Guinea lasts from May to July and in Vanuatu from October to January. In the Solomon Islands the production peak is between September and October. Nut picking can last for 2–4 months, thus the area under the tree is typically kept clean and fallen fruits can be easily collected. Harvesting from the tree by breaking off the fruiting branchlets has been found to be beneficial as it encourages renewed growth and flowering.

The processing of the seeds consists mainly in removing the shell and drying kernels directly on farm by smoking to allow a stable storage for months. Vacuum-packed Canarium nuts can be stored under ambient tropical conditions for six months with daytime temperatures of around 31 °C (88 °F), and for nine months at 25 °C (77 °F).

As the phenology of Canarium is determined by the day length, the ones growing in lower latitudes flower and fruit earlier than those in the higher latitudes. Yield is estimated to be 4-7 t kernel-in-testa per hectare per year. In the Solomon Islands, nut yields were found to vary from 80 to 320 kg nut-in-shell per tree, with an average on a healthy tree of at least 100 kg nut-in-shell (15 kg kernel) per year. Total production of Canarium in western Melanesia with 2 million trees is estimated to be more than 100'000 t of nuts-in-shell (16'000 t of kernels-in-testa with 16% kernel content) per year.

== Products ==
=== Products uses and processing technology ===
Many parts of the tree can be used. In Melanesia, except for Fiji, kernels are important in the local diet as fat and protein suppliers. Kernels are eaten raw, baked or roasted, used as a snack or added to other food, such as staple root crops, soups or even crushed and used as ice-cream toppings. Depending on the regions, they can also be used in different ways, like added to megapode eggs in the Solomon Islands or mixed with tuber puddings in Vanuatu. However, taste can vary from unpalatable bitter to a soft delicate coconut butter taste and is sensible to the processing technique.

Kernel oil is mainly used for cooking as a substitute to coconut oil or blended with other oils. It also serves as a medicinal product. It can be used in cosmetic and skin care products, in which anti-aging and anti-inflammatory agents of Canarium oil can stimulate tensin 1 expression and are thus effective against wrinkles and loss of skin firmness. In the past, the kernel oil was used as a lighter and to prevent and treat arthritis.

The testa can be added in animal feed.

The mesocarp (flesh) is used as a fertilizer.

Shells can be used as bedding for horticultural crops and for carving into jewellery. Furthermore, they can also be burned in kilns to produce clean, dense and high-grade charcoal fuel, which can be refined to "activated carbon" for pharmaceutical uses. In Papua New Guinea they are also used to make pipes for tobacco smoking.

The bark is used in the western Solomon Islands in traditional medicine against chest pain.

Timber is soft and can be used for light construction, canoes, boats, tools, crafts and sometimes as a veneer or as firewood. Moreover, if the wood is rotten, it can host edible insect larvae.

The resinous trunk extrudate is used in caulking of canoes.

=== Nutritive vale and special compounds ===
Table 1: Nutritive value of Canarium nut

Nutrients	Quantity per 100 g edible portion
Fat	45.9 g
Water	35.4 g
Fibre	10.6 g
Protein	8.2 g
Starch	0.3 g
Sugar	0.2 g
Ash	2.6 g
Potassium	627 mg
Magnesium	284 mg
Calcium	44 mg
Sodium	18 mg
Vitamin C	8 mg
Iron	3.5 mg
Zinc	2.4 mg
Niacin	1.7 mg
Copper	1.6 mg
Manganese	1.1 mg
Thiamin	0.13 mg
Riboflavin	0.06 mg
β-carotene equivalent	165 μg

Nutritive value of a raw Canarium per 100g edible portion (kernels without the hard shell) is 439 kcal/1.838 kJ energy. In terms of macronutrients, kernels contain between 67 and 80% oil, 13% protein and 7% starch and various others macronutrients and micronutrients, with a high nutritive value (Table 1). Fatty profile of kernel oil consists of almost equal proportion of saturated and unsaturated fatty acids with about 50% saturated (34% palmitic and 13% stearic), 38% monounsaturated (oleic) and 14% polyunsaturated (linoleic) fat.

In a study led in various areas of Papua New Guinea, kernels' antioxidant activity, in mg ascorbate equivalents, and phenolic content, in mg catechin equivalents, showed a strong positive relationship, as well as fat content versus energy and versus carbohydrate content. However, there was little variation in protein but large variation in vitamin E contents, especially in β-tocopherol. α-, δ- and γ- tocopherols were also present in kernels but only in small amounts.

Canarium kernels seem to possess anti-inflammatory activity through inhibition properties of its oil on prostaglandin (PGE 2) production in 3T3 Swiss Albino fibroblast cells, which workes in the same ways as aspirin. However, the IgE specific to Canarium indicum can be found among pollen allergenic patients, which addresses the need for control of new foods before the introduction to a new market.

== Breeding ==
Local varieties have been developed through selection of trees based on the kernel taste and size, oil content and thin pericarp. Since the 1970s, field surveys have been undertaken, for example to identify high yielding trees or to evaluate the potential for domestication. The various cultivars differing in shells and kernels morphology are an obstacle to breeding programs, productivity and profitability increase.

== Commercialization ==
Commercial processing and marketing started in the Solomon Islands in 1989. Since the early 1990s, a number of projects aimed to increase the commercialization of Canarium indicum, with mixed success. The first commercial products of Canarium indicum in Papua New Guinea were launched in July 2018. This market-testing phase was a part of a project of the Australian Centre of International Agricultural Research (ACIAR). Products are available in local supermarkets and duty-free stores in Papua New Guinea in three variants: roasted, peeled or natural.

Prices for nuts-in-shell are around 0.30 US$/kg and 3 US$/kg for processed kernels.
