= Proto-Oceanic language =

Reconstructed ancestor of the Oceanic languages

Proto-Oceanic
- POc
- Reconstruction of: Oceanic languages
- Region: Bismarck Archipelago
- Era: c. late 2nd millennium BCE
- Reconstructed ancestors: Proto-Austronesian: Proto-Malayo-Polynesian
- Lower-order reconstructions: Proto–Admiralty Islands; Proto–Western Oceanic; Proto-Temotu; Proto–Southeast Solomonic; Proto-Torres–Banks; Proto–New Caledonian; Proto–South Vanuatu; Proto-Micronesian; Proto–Central Pacific

Proto-Oceanic (abbreviated as POc) is a proto-language that historical linguists since Otto Dempwolff have reconstructed as the hypothetical common ancestor of the Oceanic subgroup of the Austronesian language family. Proto-Oceanic is a descendant of the Proto-Austronesian language (PAN), the common ancestor of the Austronesian languages.

Proto-Oceanic was probably spoken around the late 2nd millennium BCE in the Bismarck Archipelago, east of Papua New Guinea. Archaeologists and linguists currently agree that its community more or less coincides with the Lapita culture.

== Linguistic characteristics ==
The methodology of comparative linguistics, together with the relative homogeneity of Oceanic languages, make it possible to reconstruct with reasonable certainty the principal linguistic properties of their common ancestor, Proto-Oceanic. Like all scientific hypotheses, these reconstructions must be understood as obviously reflecting the state of science at a particular moment in time; the detail of these reconstructions is still the object of much discussion among Oceanicist scholars.

=== Phonology ===
The phonology of POc can be reconstructed with reasonable certainty. Proto-Oceanic had five vowels: *i, *e, *a, *o, *u, with no length contrast.

Twenty-three consonants are reconstructed. When the conventional transcription of a protophoneme differs from its value in the IPA, the latter is indicated:

		Labiovelar	Bilabial	Alveolar	Palatal	Velar	Uvular
Nasal		*mw /mʷ/	*m	*n	*ñ /ɲ/	*ŋ	
Plosive	voiceless	*pw /pʷ/	*p	*t	*c	*k	*q
Plosive	prenasal	*bw /ᵐbʷ/	*b /ᵐb/	*d /ⁿd/	*j /ᶮɟ/	*g /ᵑɡ/	
Fricative				*s			
Rhotic	plain			*r *R			
Rhotic	prenasal			*dr /ⁿr/			
Approximant		*w		*l	*y /j/		

Based on evidence from the Southern Oceanic and Micronesian languages, Lynch (2003) proposes that the bilabial series may have been phonetically realized as palatalized: /pʲ/ /ᵐbʲ/ /mʲ/.

=== Basic word order ===
Many Oceanic languages of New Guinea, Vanuatu, the Solomon Islands, and Micronesia are SVO, or verb-medial, languages. SOV, or verb-final, word order is considered to be typologically unusual for Austronesian languages, and is only found in some Oceanic languages of New Guinea and to a more limited extent, the Solomon Islands. This is because SOV word order is very common in some non-Austronesian Papuan languages in contact with Oceanic languages. In turn, most Polynesian languages, and several languages of New Caledonia, have the VSO word order. Whether Proto-Oceanic had SVO or VSO is still debatable.

== Lexicon ==
From the mid-1990s to 2023, reconstructing the lexicon of Proto-Oceanic was the object of the Oceanic Lexicon Project, run by scholars Andrew Pawley, Malcolm Ross and Meredith Osmond. This encyclopedic project produced six volumes altogether, all available in open access.

In addition, Robert Blust also includes Proto-Oceanic in his Austronesian Comparative Dictionary (abbr. ACD).

=== Animal names ===
Selected reconstructed Proto-Oceanic terms of various animals from Blust's ACD:

Fishes

Proto-Oceanic	Common name	Scientific name
*bubu₇	triggerfish	Balistes sp.
*sumu	triggerfish	Balistidae
*sulik	a fish, the fusilier	Caesionidae sp.
*tipi-tipi	butterflyfish	Chaetodon spp.
*taŋapa	wrasse	Cheilinus spp.
*bolo bolo	small dark surgeonfish	possibly Ctenochaetus
*komi	suckerfish / remora	Echeneis naucrates; hold on by biting
*kamaRi	a fish, the rainbow runner	Elagatis bipinnulata
*piRu-piRu	sailfish	Istiophoridae
*kulabo	a fish	Lethrinidae spp.
*sabutu; *surup₂; *susul₁; *kasika	a fish, the emperor	Lethrinus spp.
*tasiwa	sea perch	Lutjanus sp.
*pu-pulan	a white fish, the tarpon; herring	Megalops cyprinoides
*tiqo	goatfish	family Mullidae
*mwanoRe	unicornfish	Naso unicornis
*taRa	short snouted unicornfish	Naso spp.
*lau	a fish, the banded sweetlips	Plectorhinchus spp.
*lio-lio	brown triggerfish	Pseudobalistes fuscus
*kitoŋ	rabbitfish	Siganus punctatus (family Siganidae)
*palaja	rabbitfish	Siganus sp.
*takua	yellowfin tuna	Thunnus albacares
*piRa₂	sailfin tang	Zebrasoma veliferum

Birds

Proto-Oceanic	Common name	Scientific name
*pusiRa	starling	Aplonis spp.
*kaRa	male eclectus parrot	Eclectus roratus
*kao	heron	probably Egretta sp.
*kiki₁	kingfisher	Halcyon spp.
*kikau, *kipau	Bismarck scrub fowl	Megapodius eremita
*sau	a bird, the Golden Whistler	Pachycephala spp.
*takere	a bird, the fantail	Rhipidura sp.
*bune	fruit dove	probably Treron spp.
*pwirip	parrot	probably Trichoglossus sp.

Other animals

Proto-Oceanic	Common name	Scientific name
*poñu	the green turtle	Chelonia mydas
*kasi	to scrape; scraper or grater made from circular bivalve shell	Asaphis spp.
*buliq₁	cowrie shell	Cypraea mauritiana
*sapulu	bivalve mollusc	possibly Pinna sp.

=== Plant names ===
==== Pawley and Ross (2006) ====
Reconstructed Proto-Oceanic terms for horticulture and food plants (other than coconuts):

Tubers and their culture

Proto-Oceanic	Meaning
*mwapo(q)	taro (possibly all Araceae)
*talo(s)	taro, Colocasia esculenta
*piRaq	giant taro, elephant ear taro, Alocasia macrorrhiza
*bulaka	swamp taro, Cyrtosperma merkusii
*kamwa	kind of wild taro (?)
*qupi	greater yam, Dioscorea alata; yam (generic)
*pwatik	potato yam, aerial yam, Dioscorea bulbifera
*(s,j)uli(q)	banana or taro sucker, slip, cutting, shoot (i.e. propagation material)
*wasi(n)	taro stem (used for planting)
*bwaŋo	new leaves or shoots, or taro tops for planting
*up(e,a)	taro seedling
*pasoq[-i]	to plant (tubers)
*kotiŋ	to cut off taro tops

Bananas

Proto-Oceanic	Meaning
*pudi	banana, Musa cultivars
*joRaga	banana, Australimusa group
*sakup	kind of cooking banana: long with white flesh (presumably Eumusa group)

Other food plants

Proto-Oceanic	Meaning
*topu	sugar cane, Saccharum officinarum
*pijo	a kind of edible wild cane or a reed, Saccharum spontaneum
*[ka]timun	cucurbit (generic); cucumber, Cucumis sativus
*laqia	ginger, Zingiber officinale
*yaŋo	turmeric, Curcuma longa
*kuluR	breadfruit, Artocarpus altilis
*baReqo	breadfruit fruit (?)
*padran	pandanus (generic); coastal pandanus, Pandanus tectorius
*kiRe	coastal pandanus, Pandanus tectorius
*pakum	Pandanus dubius
*ima	kind of pandanus with useful leaves
*Rabia	sago, Metroxylon spp., mainly Metroxylon sagu
*sag(u)	sago starch
*qatop	sago fronds, thatch
*talise	Java almond, Indian almond, Terminalia catappa
*qipi	Tahitian chestnut, Pacific chestnut, Inocarpus fagifer
*[ka]ŋaRi	canarium almond, Canarium spp.
*molis	citrus fruit or citrus-like fruit
*pau(q)	mango, probably Mangifera indica
*wai, *waiwai	mango (generic)
*kapika	Malay apple and rose apple, Eugenia spp.
*ñonum	Morinda citrifolia
*tawan	Pometia pinnata
*wasa	edible greens, Abelmoschus manihot
*m(w)asoku	wild cinnamon, Cinnamomum spp.
*quRis	Polynesian plum, hog plum, Tahitian apple, Spondias cytherea
*ñatu(q)	kind of tree with avocado-like fruit and hard wood, Burckella obovata
*raqu(p)	New Guinea walnut, Dracontomelon dao
*buaq	areca palm, Areca catechu

Gardening practices

Proto-Oceanic	Meaning
*quma	garden
*tanoq	soil, earth
*poki	to clear ground for planting
*sara	to dig a hole
*tanum[-i]	to plant

==== Ross (2008) ====
Reconstructed plant terms from Malcolm Ross (2008):

Proto-Oceanic plant terms inherited from Proto-Austronesian or Proto-Malayo-Polynesian (65 reconstructions)

Proto-Oceanic	Meaning
*[a]ñuliŋ	Pisonia sp.
*aRu	a shore tree, Casuarina equisetifolia
*bai-bai(t)	a cycad, Cycas rumphii
*[baR]baR	coral tree, Erythrina variegata
*bitu(ŋ)	bamboo sp.
*botu(ŋ)	large bamboo, presumably Bambusa sp.
*buaq	betelnut, areca nut, palm, Areca catechu
*drokol	small Dillenia sp.
*droRu(ŋ)	Trema orientalis
*guRu(n)	sword grass, Imperata cylindrica
*[ja]latoŋ	Laportea and Dendrocnide spp.
*kanawa(n)	Cordia subcordata
*[ka]tim(o,u)n	Cucumis spp. (generic?); cucumber, Cucumis sativus
*kati(p)al	a palm with black wood, Caryota sp.
*kayu	tree or shrub: generic name for plants with woody stems and branches, probably not including palms or tree-ferns; wood, stick
*kiRe	coastal Pandanus sp., probably Pandanus tectorius
*kulapu(R)	Dillenia schlechteri
*kuluR	breadfruit, Artocarpus altilis
*laqia	ginger, Zingiber officinale (?)
*m(ʷ)aso(q)u	wild cinnamon, Cinnamomum sp., probably Cinnamomum xanthoneuron; possibly also Cananga odorata
*malo	paper mulberry, Broussonetia papyrifera; barkcloth, loincloth
*naRa	Pterocarpus indicus
*ñatuq	Burckella obovata
*nini(q)	shrub, Donax cannaeformis
*nipaq	Nypa fruticans
*niuR	coconut palm and/or fruit, Cocos nucifera
*nunuk	fig trees, Ficus taxon
*ŋiRac	Pemphis acidula
*p(ʷ)atoRu	a cycad, Cycas rumphii
*padran	coastal pandanus, Pandanus tectorius; pandanus (generic)
*pali[s,j]i	generic term for grasses and other grass-like plants
*(p,b)anaRo	Thespesia populnea
*para(k)	Zingiberaceae spp. with edible rhizomes
*paRu	Hibiscus tiliaceus
*pila(q)u	Casuarina equisetifolia
*pinu(q)an	Macaranga spp., perhaps Macaranga involucrata
*piRaq	giant taro, elephant ear taro, Alocasia macrorrhizos
*piRu(q)	fan palm, Licuala sp.
*pitaquR	Calophyllum inophyllum
*pudi	banana, Musa cultivars
*[pu-]pulu	betel pepper, Piper betle
*puna	vine used for fish poison, probably Derris elliptica
*putun	Barringtonia asiatica
*qa(l,R)a	Ficus sp.
*qaramʷaqi	Pipturus argenteus
*qasam	fern used for tying and binding, Lygodium circinnatum
*(qate-)qate	Wedelia biflora
*qauR	bamboo spp.
*qipil	a taxon of hardwood trees including Intsia bijuga and Casuarina equisetifolia
*qu(w)e	rattan, Calamus spp.
*qupi	greater yam, Dioscorea alata: yam (generic)
*Rabia	sago, Metroxylon spp., mainly Metroxylon sagu (syn. Metroxylon rumphii)
*raqu(p)	New Guinea walnut, Dracontomelon dao
*rarap	coral tree, Erythrina spp.
*talise	Terminalia catappa
*talo(s)	taro, Colocasia esculenta
*toŋoR	mangrove, Bruguiera spp.; mangroves (generic)
*topu	sugarcane, Saccharum officinarum
*toRas	a taxon of hardwood trees including Intsia bijuga (?)
*tui	Dolichandrone spathacea
*tupa	climbing shrubs, Derris spp.
*wai, *waiwai	mango (generic)
*walasi	tree sp. with poisonous sap, Semecarpus forstenii
*waR[e]	Flagellaria indica
*waRoc	generic term for vines and creepers, plants with creeping or climbing growth structure; string, rope

Proto-Oceanic plant terms inherited from Proto-Central-Eastern Malayo-Polynesian (11 reconstructions)

Proto-Oceanic	Meaning
*[bual]bual	species of palm used for making spears and bows; palm-wood spear or bow, probably Caryota sp.
*dalo	Calophyllum inophyllum
*dradrap	Hoya sp.
*ima	Pandanus sp. with useful leaves
*jasi	Cordia subcordata
*kai(k)	Albizia sp.
*[ka]ŋaRi	canarium almond, Canarium indicum
*lowaŋa	Litsea sp.
*pail	Falcataria moluccana
*pau(q)	mango, Mangifera sp. (not Mangifera indica)
*Reqi	sword grass, Imperata cylindrica

Proto-Oceanic plant terms inherited from Proto-Eastern Malayo-Polynesian (4 reconstructions)

Proto-Oceanic	Meaning
*na[su]-nasu	Scaevola taccada
*qayawan	Ficus, strangler fig taxon
*tawan	Pometia pinnata
*tuRi-tuRi	candlenut tree, Aleurites moluccanus (?)

Reconstructed terms with no external cognates

Proto-Oceanic plant terms with no known non-Oceanic cognates (97 reconstructions)

Proto-Oceanic	Meaning
*ba(k,g)a	banyan tree, medium-sized Ficus spp., not stranglers
*babak	Falcataria moluccana
*bala	taxon including various Euodia spp. (?)
*baqun	banana cultivar
*baReko	breadfruit
*bau	hardwood taxon
*bele	Abelmoschus manihot
*beta	breadfruit
*biRi-biRi	Hernandia nymphaefolia
*bosi	a forest tree with white wood, probably Euodia elleryana
*bou	Fagraea spp.
*bulu	Garcinia sp., perhaps Garcinia novo-guineensis
*b(ʷ)ala	tree fern, Cycas or Cyathea sp.
*bʷau	bamboo
*bʷele	bamboo sp.
*bʷera	Musa cultivar
*drala	shrub sp., Vitex trifolia
*(dr,d)aRa(q,k)a	wild nutmeg, Myristica sp.
*i(u)bu	Corynocarpus cribbianus
*iguRa	Ficus sp. with sandpapery leaves, either Ficus copiosa or Ficus wassa or both
*ipi	Tahitian chestnut, Inocarpus fagifer
*jajal	croton, Codiaeum variegatum
*jamaR	Commersonia bartramia
*jiRi	taxon consisting of Cordyline fruticosa and Dracaena angustifolia
*joRaga	banana, Fei (?) cultivars
*ka(mʷa)-kamʷa	Ficus sp., perhaps Ficus nodosa
*ka[(r,l)a]qabusi	Acalypha spp.
*kalaka	Planchonella sp.
*kapika	Malay apple, rose apple, Syzygium malaccense
*karagʷam	seaweed, seagrass
*kaRi(q)a	taxon of decorative plants
*kaRi(q)ana	Pandanus lamekotensis
*kayu qone	Heritiera littoralis
*koka	Macaranga spp.
*koma(r,R)(o,u)	Endospermum sp.
*kopu	bamboo sp.
*koRa	wild mango, Mangifera minor
*kurat	the dye produced from Morinda citrifolia
*m(ʷ)ase	wild mulberry, paper mulberry, Broussonetia papyrifera
*ma(i)tagaR(a)	Kleinhovia hospita
*mapuqan	Flueggea flexuosa (?)
*maqota	Dysoxylum spp.
*maRakita	the putty nut, probably Parinari laurina and Parinari glaberrima
*maRako	Trichospermum peekelii
*mari(a)sapa	Syzygium sp.
*molis	citrus fruit or citrus-like fruit, perhaps Clymenia polyandra
*mʷala(q)u	Glochidion philippicum
*mʷalak (?)	spider lily, Crinum asiaticum
*mʷaña	Pandanus sp., perhaps Pandanus conoideus
*mʷapo(q)	taro, Colocasia esculenta
*mʷaruqe	Dioscorea sp. or perhaps a cultivar of Dioscorea alata
*nipus	Cryptocarya sp.
*ñoñu	Morinda citrifolia
*olaŋa	Campnosperma brevipetiolatum
*pakum	Pandanus dubius
*pala(ŋ)	cut nut, bush nut, Barringtonia novae-hiberniae (green variety?)
*paliaRua	a vine, Merremia peltata
*paqo	Heliconia sp.
*paqu	Kleinhovia hospita
*pasa(r,R)	Vitex cofassus
*pesi	a coastal forest tree, perhaps Pongamia pinnata
*pi(y)uŋ	Miscanthus floridulus
*pijo	cane or reed taxon, including Saccharum spontaneum
*poipoi	Pandanus sp., perhaps Pandanus tectorius
*poka(q)	variety of Malay apple
*(p,b)oso	kind of taro
*puRe	taxon of beach creepers; perhaps prototypically Ipomoea grandiflora and Ipomoea pes-caprae
*pʷa(k,g)e	kind of green vegetable (?)
*pʷabosi	free-standing small or medium-sized Ficus sp., probably Ficus wassa
*p(ʷ)asa(r,R)	large Pandanus sp.
*pʷatika	potato yam, aerial yam, Dioscorea bulbifera
*p(ʷ)awa(t)	Cerbera spp., probably Cerbera floribunda and Cerbera manghas
*pʷete	bird's nest fern, Asplenium nidus
*pʷi(r,R)a	Cananga odorata
*qarop	Premna spp.
*qat(V)	Terminalia sp. with edible nut
*(q,k)atita	the putty nut, probably Parinari laurina and Parinari glaberrima
*(q)alipa, *lalipa	nut sp., possibly canarium almond, Canarium sp. (?)
*qope	Gyrocarpus americanus
*quRis	Spondias cytherea
*(quta)quta	grass and weeds (generic)
*rabum	grass
*Rigi	rosewood, Pterocarpus indicus
*sabakap	Alstonia scholaris
*sakup	banana cultivar with long fruit (?)
*seRa	Ficus sp., perhaps Ficus adenosperma
*sila	Job's tears, Coix lacryma-jobi
*tamanu	Calophyllum sp.
*taŋa	Ficus tinctoria
*tapi(l)	puzzlenut tree, Xylocarpus granatum (?)
*tapoRa	a nut-bearing tree sp.
*tawasi	Rhus taitensis
*toRu	Cordia subcordata
*udu(r,R)	Dioscorea alata cultivar (?)
*wasa	Abelmoschus manihot; green vegetables in general
*wasi-wasi	Abroma augusta
*yaŋo	turmeric, Curcuma longa

Proto-Western Oceanic plant terms with no known external cognates (22 reconstructions)

Proto-Oceanic	Meaning
*bara	Macaranga spp.
*basi	mango
*baul	mangrove, Rhizophora sp. (?)
*bʷana	Intsia bijuga
*bʷatiq	banana cultivar
*gobu	Dioscorea sp.
*ka(p)ul	seed yam
*kamisa	lesser yam, Dioscorea esculenta
*kam(ʷ)apaR	Cryptocarya sp.
*kasuwai	mango
*kobo	taxon of Macaranga spp.
*kokoi	mushroom sp.
*[ku,i]Rim(a,o)	Octomeles sumatrana
*lapuka	kind of tree with fruit similar to breadfruit, Parartocarpus venenosa (?)
*m(ʷ)ali	Derris sp.
*mamisa	lesser yam, Dioscorea esculenta
*moke	Pandanus sp.
*mʷa(r,R)e	taxon including Codiaeum variegatum and Cordyline fruticosa
*nagi	Cordia sp.
*(s,j)a(q,k)umu	Pandanus sp.
*tabun	Garcinia sp.
*tabuqaR	Saccharum edule

Proto-Eastern Oceanic plant terms with no known external cognates (15 reconstructions)

Proto-Oceanic	Meaning
*bakuRa	Calophyllum sp., probably Calophyllum kajewskii
*buka	taxon of littoral trees, including Pisonia spp. and Gyrocarpus americanus
*bulipa	Ficus sp.
*gama	Finschia cloroxantha
*(k)a(r,l)adroŋa	Acalypha sp.
*koka	tree sp., Bischofia javanica
*mabʷe	Tahitian chestnut, Inocarpus fagifer
*melo	Elaeocarpus angustifolius
*milo	Thespesia populnea
*mʷa(q)ele	a cycad, Cycas rumphii
*pakalo, *pʷakala (?)	Hibiscus sp.
*paRage	Pangium edule
*pinuaq	a nut tree, perhaps Canarium sp. (?)
*rako	Heliconia sp., usually Heliconia indica
*sinu	taxon of shrubs whose sap causes irritation, including species of Phaleria

Proto-Remote Oceanic plant terms with no known external cognates (6 reconstructions)

Proto-Oceanic	Meaning
*buavu	Hernandia sp.
*maRi	breadfruit
*sasaRu	Abelmoschus manihot
*vaRo	Neisosperma oppositifolium
*vuba	kind of vine, probably Derris elliptica
*wasi-wasi	Sterculia vitiensis

==== Blust and Trussel (2020) ====
Selected reconstructed Proto-Oceanic terms of various plants from the Austronesian Comparative Dictionary:

Proto-Oceanic	Common name	Scientific name
*kalaqabusi	a shrub	Acalypha sp.
*piRaq₂	wild taro, elephant-ear or itching taro	Alocasia spp.
*sabakap	a tree	Alstonia scholaris
*putun₁	a shore tree	Barringtonia spp.
*que	rattan	Calamus sp.
*pitaquR	a shore tree	Calophyllum inophyllum
*kaŋaRi	tree with edible nut, the Canarium almond	Canarium commune
*(q)alipa	a nut tree	Canarium sp.
*aRu	a shore tree	Casuarina equisetifolia
*talos	taro	Colocasia esculenta
*toRu	a tree	Cordia subcordata
*aŋo	turmeric	Curcuma longa
*punat	a plant used to stun fish	Derris elliptica
*tupa₂	fish poison	Derris spp.
*pwatika	potato yam, aerial yam	Dioscorea bulbifera
*rarap	a tree with dense clusters of red flowers, the Indian coral tree	Erythrina indica
*buRat	a tree with sweet-smelling flowers	Fagraea berteroana
*pail	a plant	Falcataria moluccana
*taŋa₃	a shrub with edible figs	Ficus tinctoria
*baka₂	kind of banyan tree	Ficus sp.
*pwano-pwano	a plant	Guettarda speciosa
*paqo	a plant	Heliconia spp.
*kuRun; *pitu₂	sword grass	Imperata cylindrica
*ipi₂	the ‘Tahitian chestnut’	Inocarpus fagiferus or Inocarpus edulis
*puRe₂	beach creepers	including Ipomoea grandiflora and Ipomoea pes-caprae
*pau	a plant	Kleinhovia hospita
*karat₂	a small stinging plant	perhaps Laportea interrupta
*latoŋ, *la-latoŋ, *salatoŋ, *silatoŋ	stinging nettle	Laportea spp.
*piRu	fan palm	Licuala rumphii
*pinuan	a tree	Macaranga spp.
*koka	a tree	Macaranga spp., Euphorbiaceae
*koRa	wild mango	Mangifera minor
*paliaRua	a vine	Merremia peltata
*gurat	a tree with roots that furnish a red dye	Morinda citrifolia tree
*kurat	the dye produced from the Morinda citrifolia	Morinda citrifolia dye
*ñoñu	tree with inedible white fruit and root that yields a useful dye	Morinda citrifolia tree
*paoq (ʔ)	a tree	Ochrosia oppositifolia
*mwaña	pandanus sp.	probably Pandanus conoideus
*kiRe	a pandanus	Pandanus odoratissimus; a mat made from the leaves of this plant
*katita	putty nut	Parinari laurinum
*pu-pulu	betel pepper	Piper betle
*pesi	coastal tree	perhaps Pongamia pinnata
*tawasi	a tree	Rhus taitensis
*pijo	kind of reed or cane	including Saccharum spontaneum
*kapika, *kapiku	the Malay apple	Syzygium malaccense
*talise₁	a shore tree with edible nuts	Terminalia catappa
*pasa(r,R)	a woody plant or tree	Vitex cofassus

=== Pottery ===
There are several known reconstructed words evident of material pottery culture among the Lapita:

- *kuroŋ – earthernware pot
- *kalala(ŋ) – water jar
- *palaŋa – frying pan (cf. Malay belanga)

== Example sentences ==
From Lynch, Ross, and Crowley (2002):

*I=kaRat-i=a a tau na ᵐboRok.
3SG=bite-TR=3SG ART person ART pig
'The pig bit a/the person.'

*A na=ᵑgu a Rumaq.
ART CL=3SG ART house
'The house is mine.'

From Ross (2004):

*Au=papa-i=a natu-mu i=ua i laur.
1SG=carry-TR=3SG child-2SG 3SG=go PREP coast
'I brought your child (to you) to the beach.'

*Ra=sipo ra=paqus-i=a na waᵑga.
3PL=go.down 3PL=bind-TR=3SG ART canoe
'They went down to bind up the canoe.'

== See also ==
- Proto-Polynesian language
- Proto-Austronesian language
- Proto-Malayo-Polynesian language
- Proto-Philippine language
