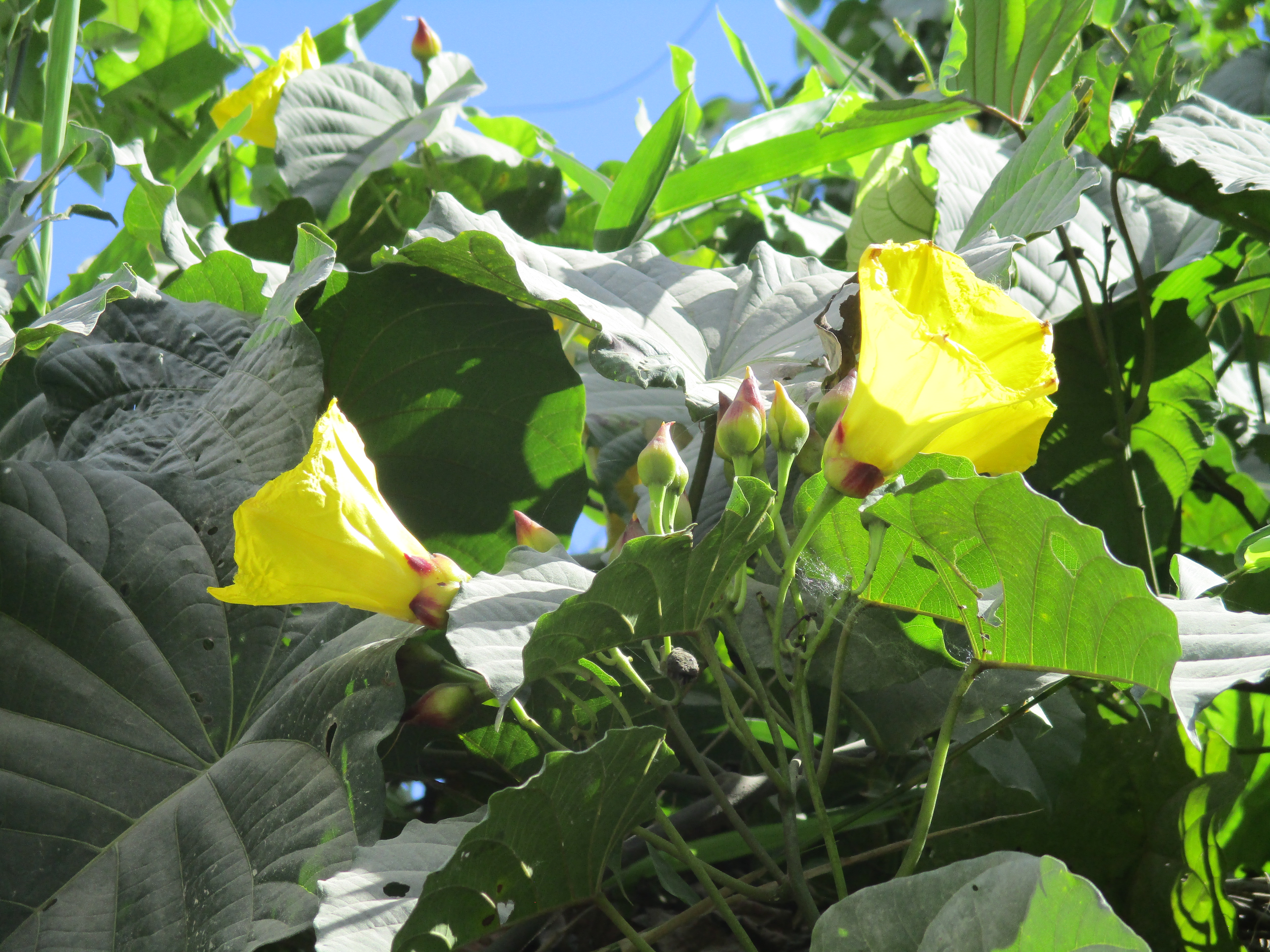
- Decalobanthus peltatus in Sulawesi, Indonesia

Scientific classification
- Kingdom: Plantae
- Clade: Tracheophytes
- Clade: Angiosperms
- Clade: Eudicots
- Clade: Asterids
- Order: Solanales
- Family: Convolvulaceae
- Genus: Decalobanthus; Ooststr.

= Decalobanthus =

Genus of flowering plants

Decalobanthus is a genus of flowering plants in the family Convolvulaceae. Its native range is Tanzania, the Western Indian Ocean, tropical and subtropical Asia to the Pacific.

As of November 2024, Plants of the World Online accepted these species:

- Decalobanthus bimbim (Gagnep.) A.R.Simões & Staples
- Decalobanthus boisianus (Gagnep.) A.R.Simões & Staples
- Decalobanthus borneensis (Merr.) A.R.Simões & Staples
- Decalobanthus bracteatus (P.S.Bacon) A.R.Simões & Staples
- Decalobanthus calyculatus (Ooststr.) A.R.Simões & Chatrou
- Decalobanthus clemensianus (Ooststr.) A.R.Simões & Chatrou
- Decalobanthus crassinervius (Ooststr.) A.R.Simões & Chatrou
- Decalobanthus discoidespermus (Donn.Sm.) Staples
- Decalobanthus distillatorius (Blanco) Staples
- Decalobanthus eberhardtii (Gagnep.) A.R.Simões & Staples
- Decalobanthus elmeri (Merr.) A.R.Simões & Staples
- Decalobanthus korthalsianus (Ooststr.) A.R.Simões & Staples
- Decalobanthus mammosus (Lour.) A.R.Simões & Staples
- Decalobanthus ooststroomii Staples
- Decalobanthus pacificus (Ooststr.) A.R.Simões & Staples
- Decalobanthus peltatus (L.) A.R.Simões & Staples
- Decalobanthus pulcher (Ooststr.) A.R.Simões & Staples
- Decalobanthus sumatranus Ooststr.
