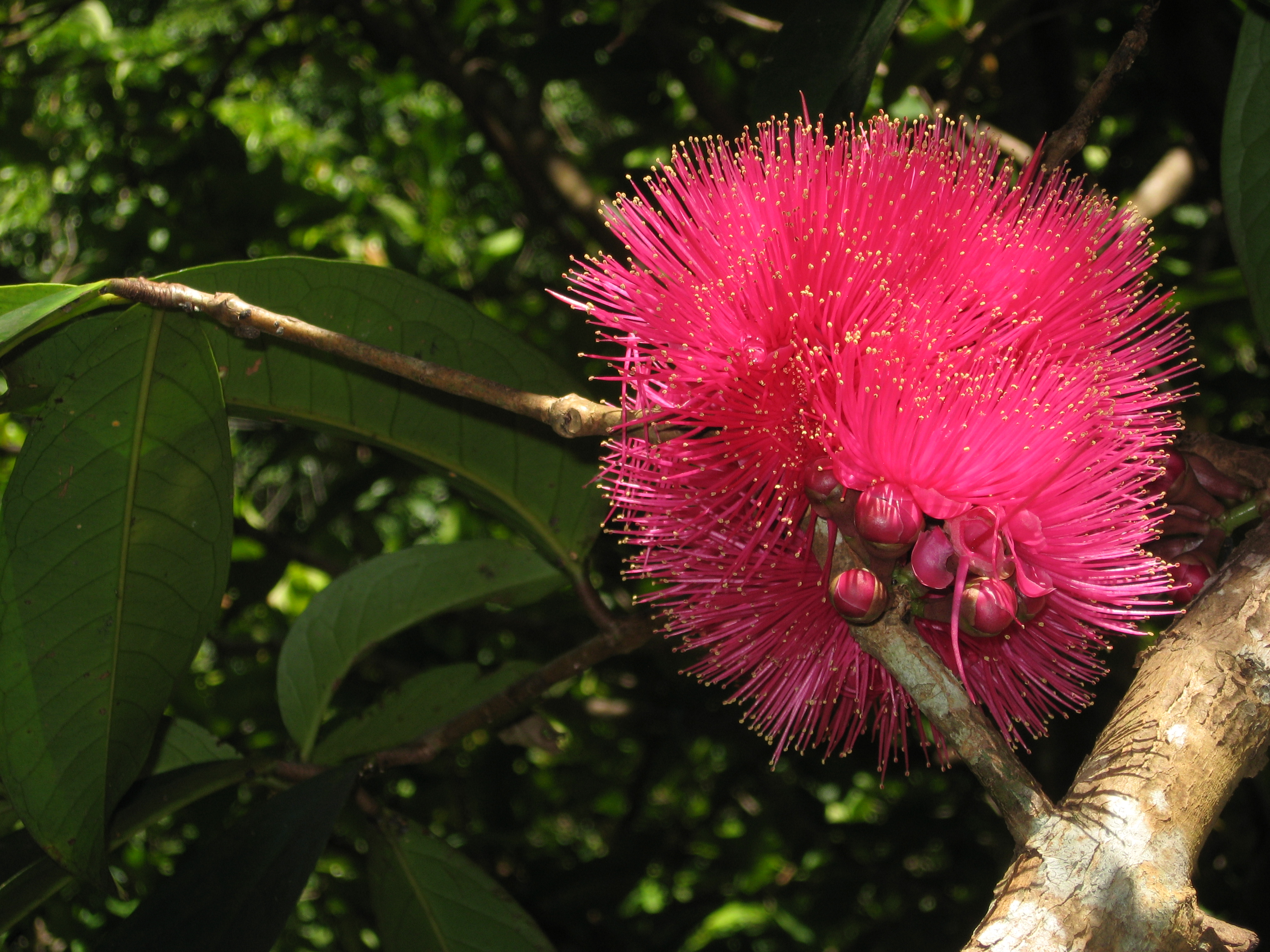

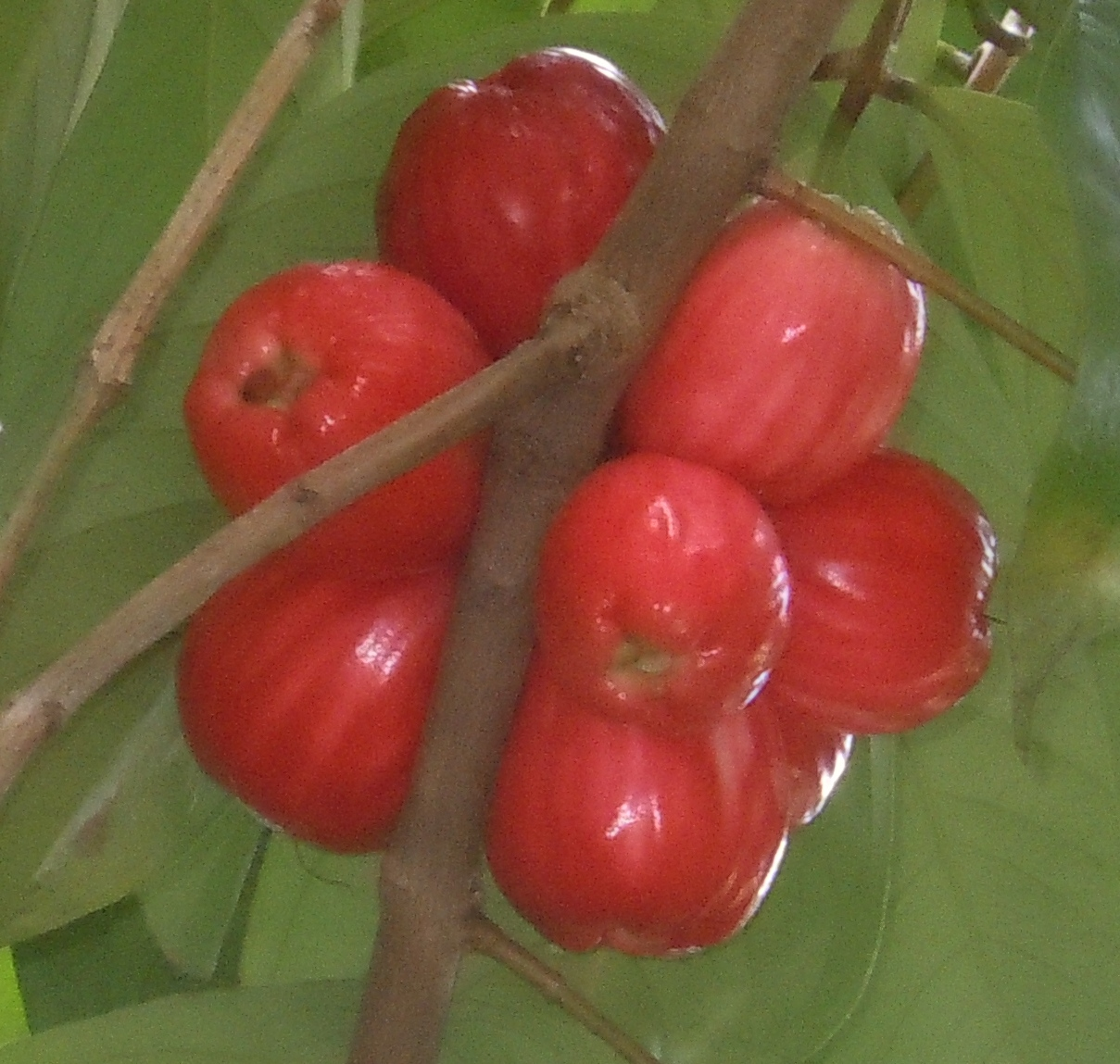
- Syzygium malaccense Flower and Fruit

Conservation status
- Least Concern (IUCN 3.1)
- Rare (NCA)

Scientific classification
- Kingdom: Plantae
- Clade: Tracheophytes
- Clade: Angiosperms
- Clade: Eudicots
- Clade: Rosids
- Order: Myrtales
- Family: Myrtaceae
- Genus: Syzygium
- Species: S. malaccense

Binomial name
- Syzygium malaccense (L.) Merr. & L.M.Perry, 1938

Synonyms
- 17 synonyms: Caryophyllus malaccensis (L.) Stokes; Eugenia malaccensis L.; Jambosa malaccensis (L.) DC.; Myrtus malaccensis (L.) Spreng.; Eugenia domestica Baill.; Eugenia macrophylla Lam.; Eugenia pseudomalaccensis Linden; Eugenia purpurascens Baill.; Eugenia purpurea Roxb.; Jambosa domestica DC.; Jambosa laevis Montrouz.; Jambosa macrophylla (Lam.) DC.; Jambosa purpurascens DC.; Jambosa purpurea (Roxb.) Wight & Arn.; Myrtus lamarckii F.Dietr.; Myrtus macrophylla (Lam.) Spreng.; Syzygium laeve (Montrouz.) Govaerts

= Syzygium malaccense =

Species of plant

Syzygium malaccense is a species of flowering tree native to tropical Asia and Australia. It was cultivated from prehistoric times by the Austronesian peoples and introduced deliberately to remote Oceania as canoe plants. In modern times, it has been introduced throughout the tropics, including the Caribbean. The ripe fruit is edible but with little flavor.

== Names ==
Syzygium malaccense has a number of English common names. It is known as Malay rose apple, Malay apple, mountain apple, rose apple, Otaheite apple, pink satin-ash, Jamaican Apple, plumrose and pommerac (derived from pomme Malac, meaning 'Malayan apple' in French).

In Hawaii, S. malaccense is called mountain apple or 'Ōhi'a 'ai. In Costa Rica, it is known as manzana de agua. In Jamaica, it is referred to as the Otaheite Apple. It is found mainly in the rainy zones on the Atlantic coast of the country. In Colombia, Puerto Rico, and other Latin American countries it is also found and known as poma rosa. In Venezuela, it is known as pumalaca. In Vanuatu is it called nakavita.

== Description ==
The tree is a medium to large perennial, growing 5–15 metres (16 1/2–49 ft) tall. Its leaves are simple, elliptical, or oval-shaped with pointed tips and smooth edges. The leaves are thick and glossy above. The flowers grow in clusters at the branch ends, displaying bright pink or red colors. The fruit is up to 10 centimetres (4 in) long, oval to bell-shaped, green when unripe, and deep red or pink to white with red streaks when ripe. It contains a single large seed inside.

== Distribution and habitat ==
The species is native to tropical Asia and Australia.

== Cultivation ==
The combination of tree, flowers and fruit has been praised as the most beautiful of its genus.

Malay apple is a strictly tropical tree and will be damaged by freezing temperatures. It thrives in humid climates with an annual rainfall of 152 cm (60 in) or more. It can grow at altitudes from sea level up to 2,740 m (8,990 ft). It flowers in early summer, bearing fruit three months afterward.

When the Polynesians reached the Hawaiian Islands, they brought plants and animals that were important to them. The mountain apple was one of these "canoe plants," arriving 1,000–1,700 years ago. In modern times, it has been introduced throughout the tropics, including many Caribbean countries and territories.

== Uses ==
The mountain apple is an edible fruit that can be consumed when raw and ripe. Its taste is bland but refreshing. In 1793, Captain William Bligh was commissioned to procure edible fruits from the Pacific Islands for Jamaica, including this species. He brought back this from Tahiti (called Otaheite at the time).

In Puerto Rico, the Malay apple is used to make wines, in Hawaiʻi, the fruits are consumed the same way a Pacific Northwest apple is eaten. Indonesians consume the flowers of the tree in salads and in Guyana the skin of the mountain apple is cooked down to make a syrup. A mountain apple has a white fleshy fruit that has a similar texture to a pear but less sweet than an apple. Jam can be prepared by stewing the flesh with brown sugar and ginger.

Coffee growers use the species to both divert birds and provide shade.

=== Nutrition ===
Due to the high water content, the Mountain Apple is lower in calories than a Gala apple or a Fuji apple and contains a moderate amount of vitamins and minerals. Below is a chart with more nutrition information derived from Malay apples found in Hawaiʻi, El Salvador, and Ghana.

Food Value Per 100g of Edible Portion	
Moisture	90.3–91.6 g
Protein	0.5–0.7g
Fat	0.1–0.2 g
Fiber	0.6–0.8 g
Ash	0.26–0.39 g
Calcium	5.6–5.9 g
Phosphorus	11.6–17.9 g
Iron	0.2–0.82 g
Carotene	0.003–0.008 mg
Vitamin A	3–10 I.U.
Thiamine	15–39 mcg
Riboflavin	20–39 g
Niacin	0.21–0.41 mg
Ascorbic Acid	6.5–17.0 mg

== Gallery ==
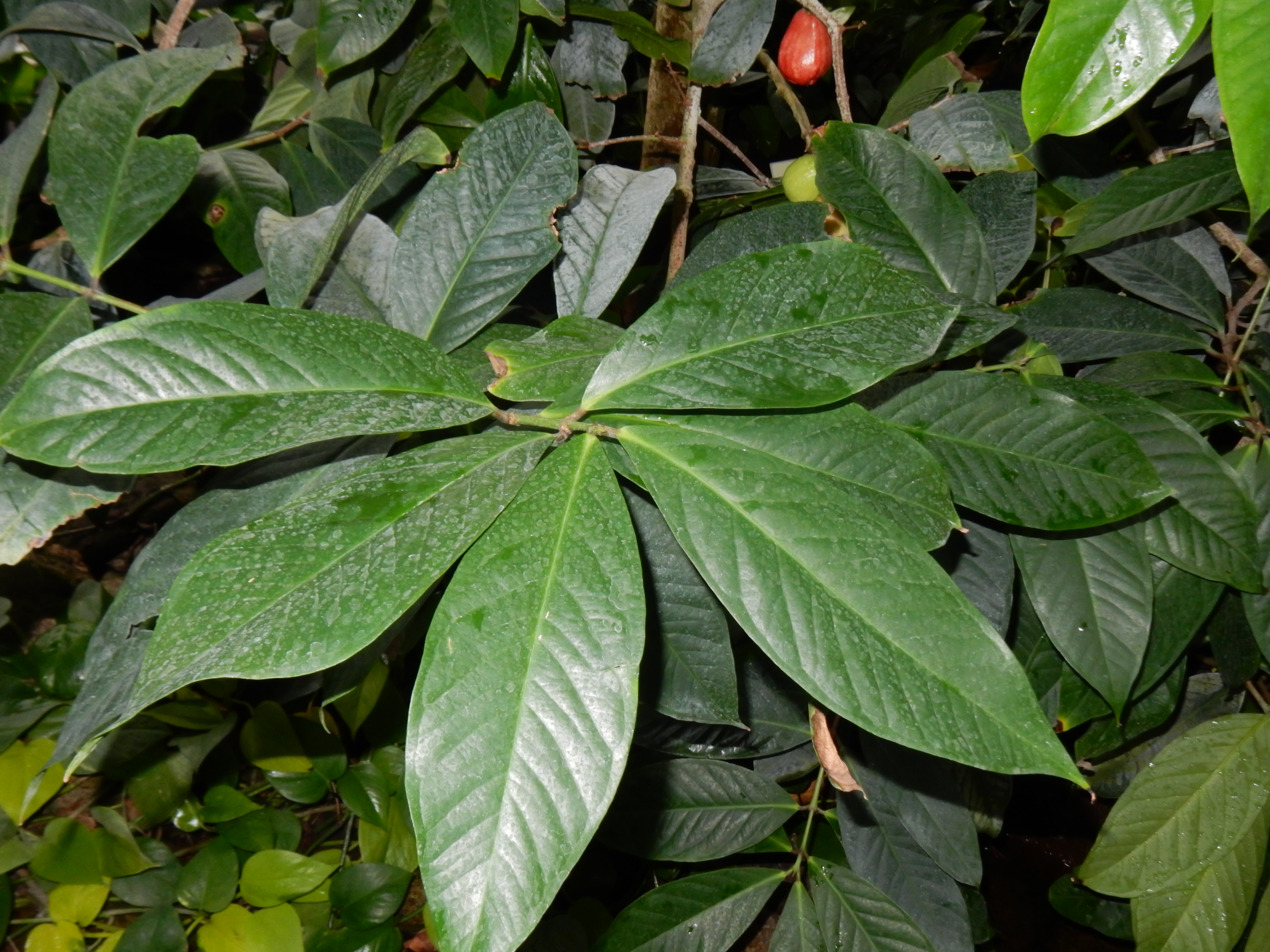
Foliage

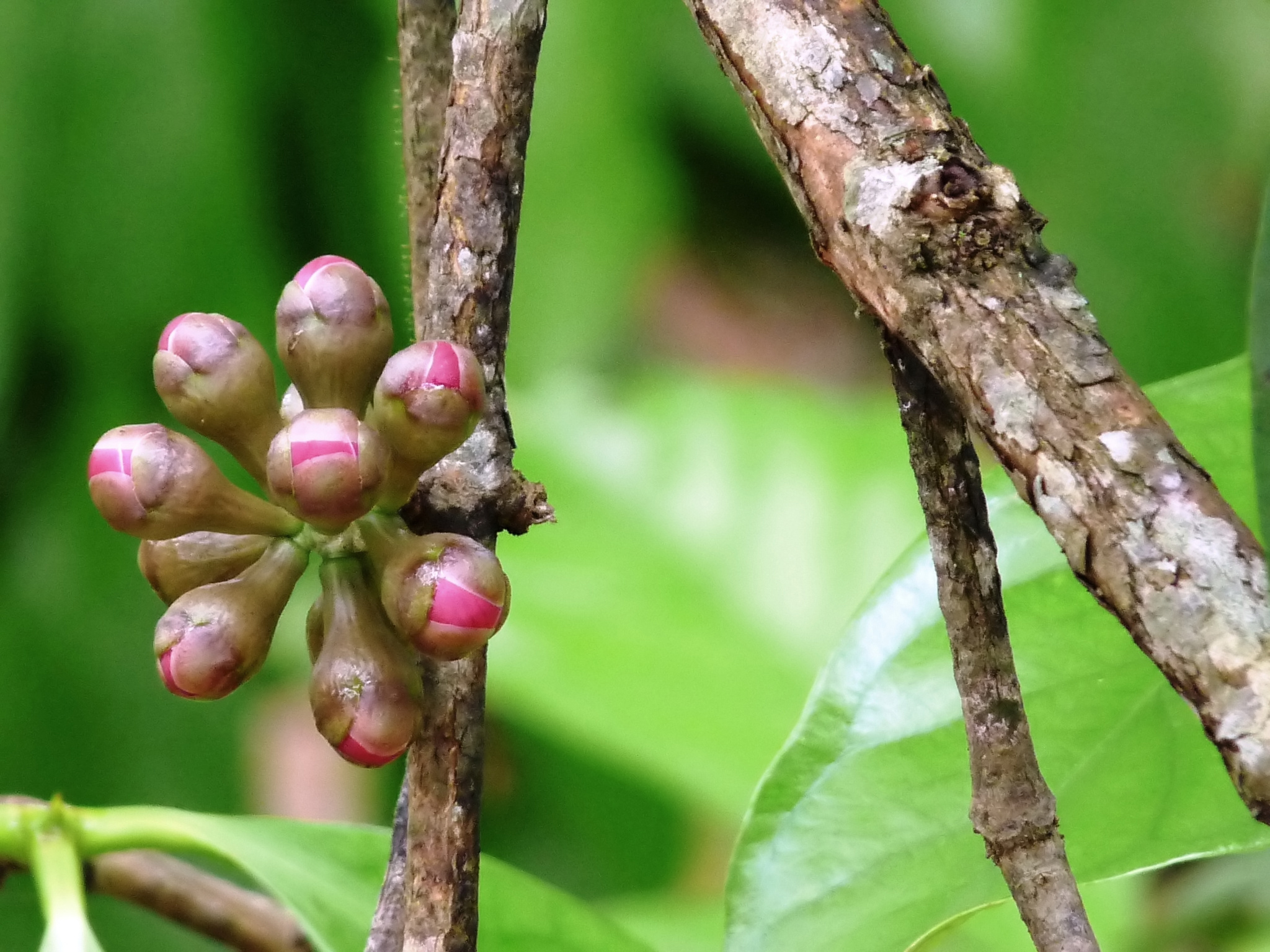
Flower buds

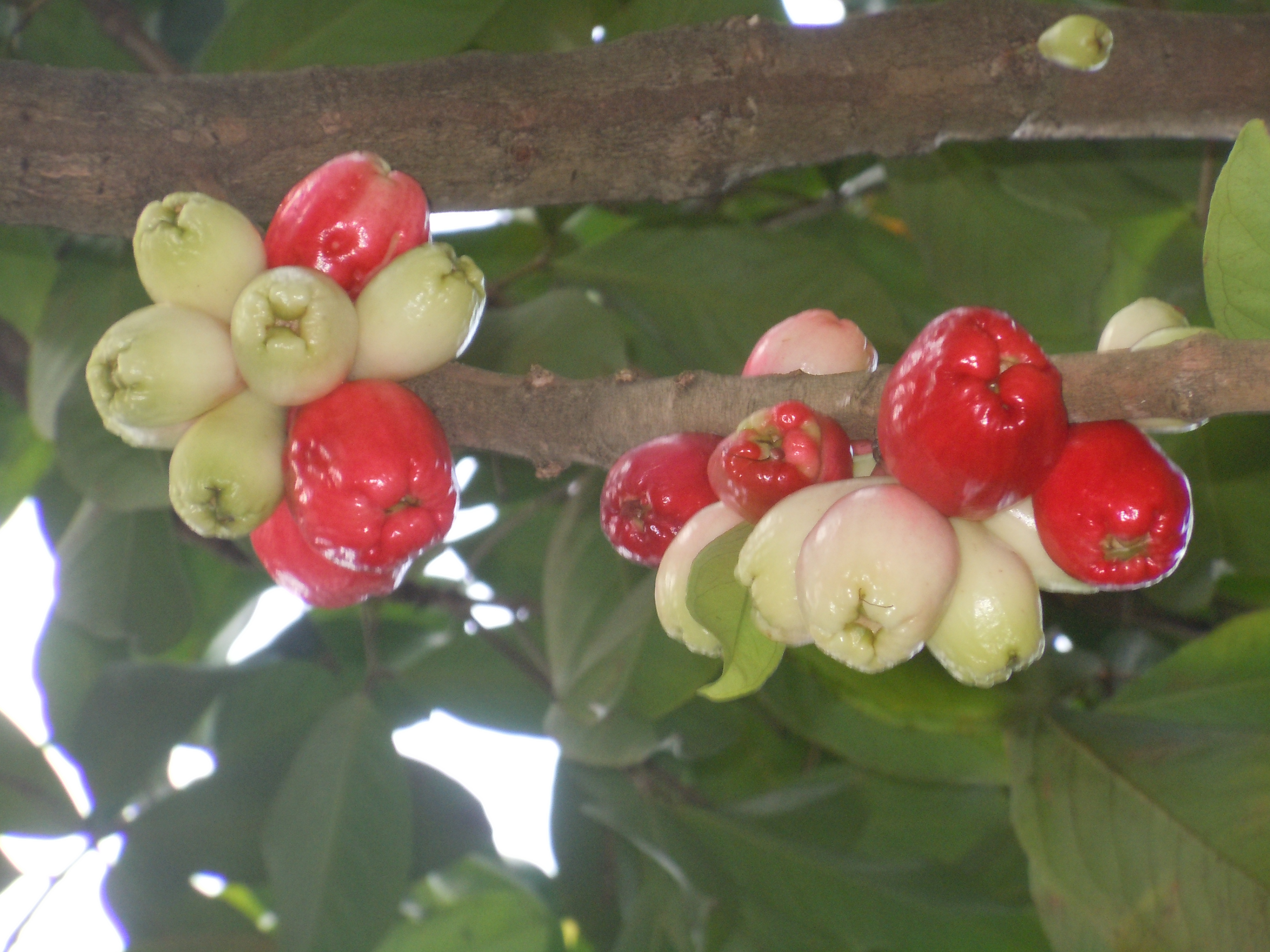
Fruits

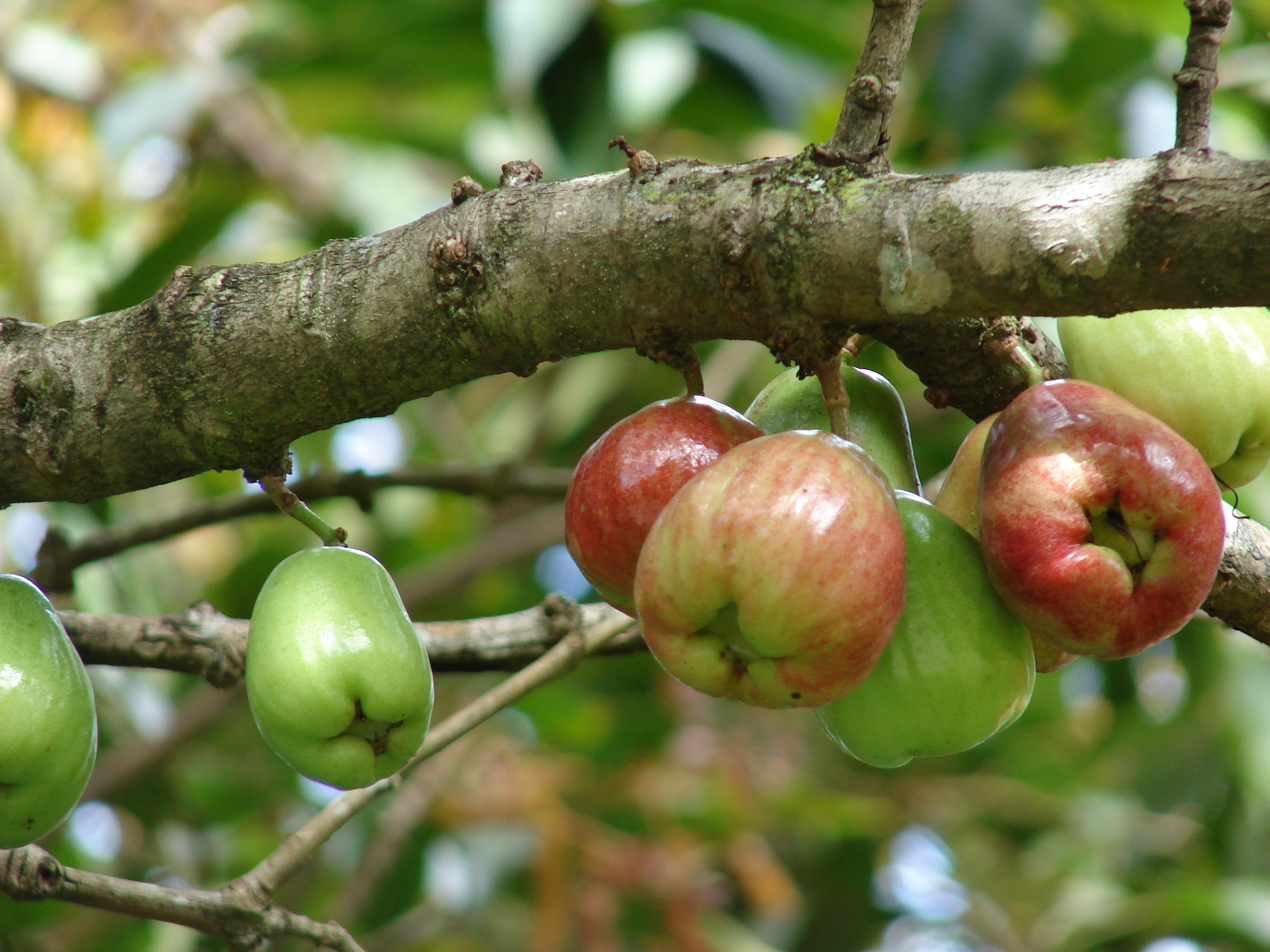
Fruits close-up

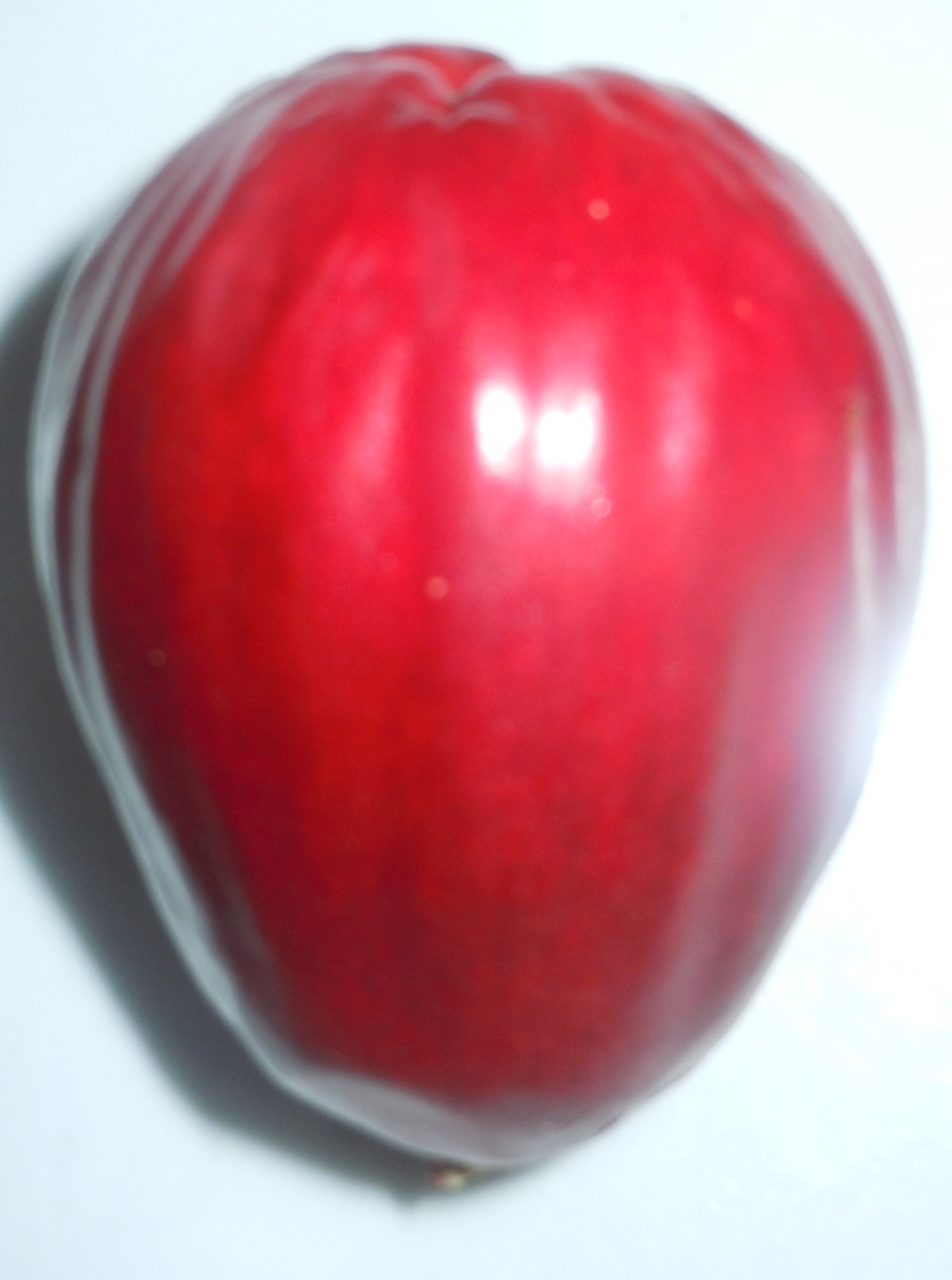
Ripened whole fruit

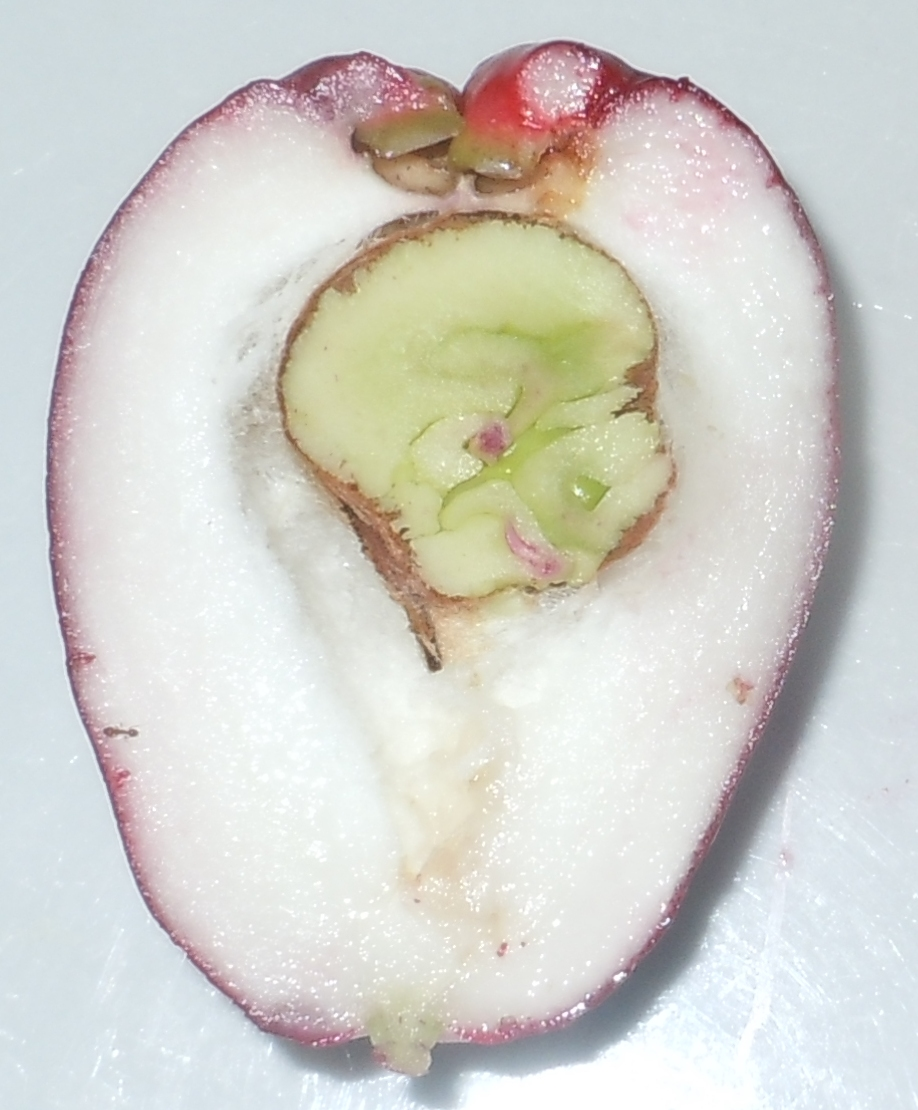
Halved ripe fruit, showing seed

== See also ==
- Domesticated plants and animals of Austronesia
