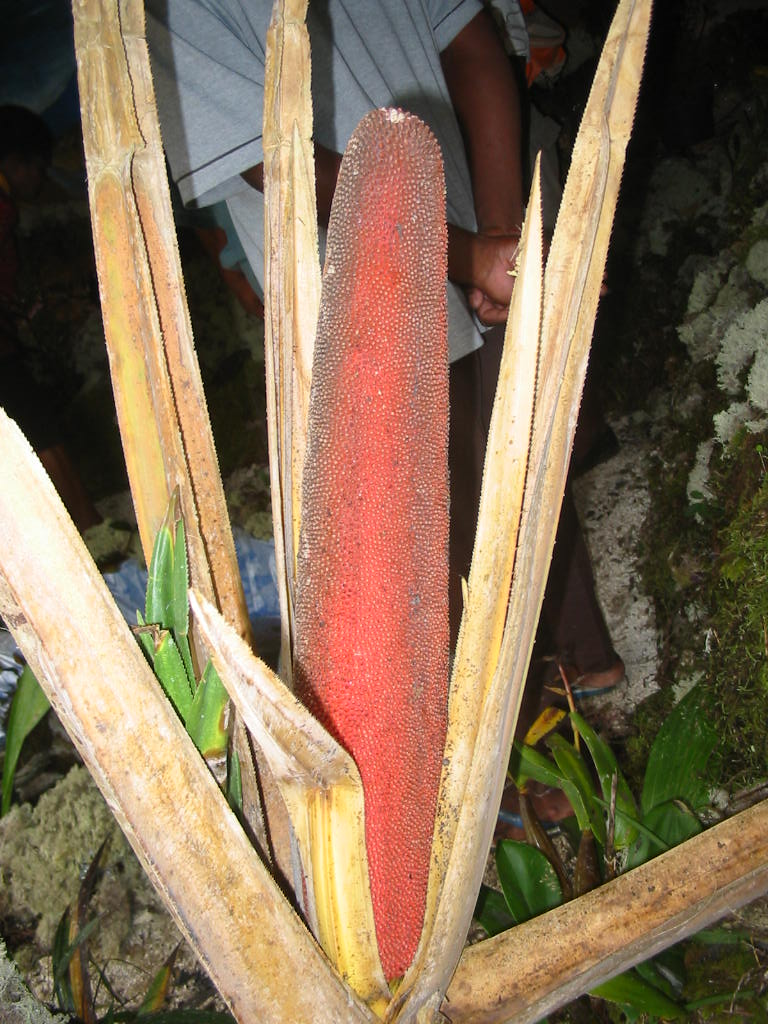

Scientific classification
- Kingdom: Plantae
- Clade: Tracheophytes
- Clade: Angiosperms
- Clade: Monocots
- Order: Pandanales
- Family: Pandanaceae
- Genus: Pandanus
- Species: P. conoideus

Binomial name
- Pandanus conoideus Lam.

= Pandanus conoideus =

Species of fruit and plant

Pandanus conoideus is a plant in the Pandanus family from New Guinea. Its fruit is eaten in Papua New Guinea and Papua, Indonesia. The fruit has several names: marata, marita in Papua New Guinea local language, kuansu in Dani of Wamena or buah merah ("red fruit") in common Indonesian. The fruit is typically prepared by splitting it, wrapping it in leaves, and cooking it in an earth oven, making it a traditional delicacy.

Fruits of the pandanus family have specific characteristics that distinguish them from other fruits, including their very concentrated red color, indicating that the fruits are rich in beta carotene.

== Description ==
Pandanus conoideus is a medium-sized tree 2–3.5 m (6.6–11.5 ft) tall, grows in clusters of 12-30 individuals, until about 10 years old, and starts producing fruit at the age of 1.5-5 years old, with a fruiting period of about 3-4 months. The trunk has a diameter of around 20–40 cm (7.9–15.7 in), brown coloured with white patches, the direction of growth is vertical or upright, with around 2−4 branches, and has spiny surface. It has a taproot system with the main root length ranges from 0.2–3.5 m (0.66–11.48 ft), with root circumference 6–20 cm (2.4–7.9 in), brown coloured with white patches, the roots formed clumps of 6-97 roots/branch.

Leaves measuring 96 cm × 9.3 cm (37.8 in × 3.7 in) to 323 cm × 15 cm (127.2 in × 5.9 in). Has a strap-shaped (lanceolate-elongate) leaves that is mucronate at the tip and has a truncate base, the edges, the adaxial ventral pleats, and on the vein of the leaves are thorny. Single leaf composition with alternating leaf arrangement in a rosette and tristichous. Leaves are flexible, dark green, have parallel leaf veins, have no smell, and are attached directly to the stem with no petiole (sessile).

The flowers look like jackfruit flowers with reddish color. The individual fruit is a drupe, and these merge to varying degrees forming multiple fruit, can be cylindrical or triangular with blunt rounded tip and heart-shaped base, 30–110 cm (12–43 in) in length, 10–15 cm (3.9–5.9 in) in diameter measured in the middle.

Typically, the fruit changes from pale red to red brick color as it matures. Depending on its variety, like Mbarugum, Maler, and Magari, desirable attributes include having 5-10 fruits per clump, a soft pith, large size, can produce 120 ml oil per kg fruit, have 5-10 samplings per cluster, as well as numerous root branches.

== Cultivation and uses ==
Usually cultivated as a source of food and folk medicine. In Indonesia, buah merah is used in mixture of chayote leaf vegetable, sweet potato leaf (hipere), or cabbage. As buah merah contain large amount of oil, it makes vegetables more savory. Buah merah can also be made into sauce although it is unpopular as it can cause insomnia if consumed in large quantities, on the other hand, in Papua New Guinea, the fruit is made into a red sauce out of it which is called marita sauce. Marita sauce is a ketchup-like substance which is used to flavor food. Others uses include making it into ice cream, pudding, taro, and drinks. In the process of making extract, the leftover pulp can also be made into cake and dodol.

Aside from making it into food, Papuans also used the sweet fruit as bait to capture birds of paradise, tree cuscus, ground rats. As well as combination for cattle fodder. It is also used for construction materials, with the roots are made into ropes and floor mats, and its timber used to construct walls.

== Cultivars ==
Cultivars are separated based on the size, color, and shape of the fruit. Pandanus conoideus is separated to 6 broad variety which include, buah merah panjang (long red), buah merah sedang (medium red), buah merah pendek (short red), buah merah cokelat (brown), buah merah kuning panjang (yellow long), and buah merah kuning pendek (yellow short). Of these, variety are further developed to a number of accessions which are widely cultivated;

Commonly cultivated accessions
Name	Trunk/branch	Leaf	Fruit
Maler	Tall, big and branching, with 2-15 branches, 6-16 roots/branch, 3 years to start fruiting	Big leaf, length is 1.4-2.1 m, width 7-10 cm, thorns are packed tightly	Big and Long with length of 60-86 cm, triangular and rounded, the base circumference is 35-54 cm, the edge circumference 16-28 cm, weighing at 6–9.5 kg, reds and disorganised, high oil content
Mbarugum	Tall with height of 2–3.5 m, diameter is 20-40 cm, 2-4 branches, 11-97 roots/branch with long spikes, 3-5 years to start fruiting, fruit mature in 3-4 months	Big leaf, length 3.23 m, width 15 cm, thorns are packed tightly, tip has thorn	Big and Long with length of 68-110 cm, cylindrical, the base circumference 31.5-40.5 cm, the edge circumference 14-20 cm, weighing at 7-10 kg, reds and in disorganised rows
Ibagaya	Short to medium, with 2-8 branches, diameter 30-46 cm, 6-13 roots/branch, start to fruit in 16 months	Medium, length 1.1-1.6 m, width 4-8 cm, sparse thorns	Small with length of 30-46 cm, rounded, the base circumference 35-44 cm, the edge circumference 10-15 cm, weighing at 5-6 kg, reds and in disorganised rows, savoury and low oil content.
Kuanggo	Medium with 2-8 branches, diameter 30-46 cm, 6-13 roots/branch, start to fruit in 16 months	Medium size, length 1.1-1.6 m, width 4-8 cm, tightly packed thorns	triangular with length of 35-58 cm, the base circumference 39-54 cm, the edge circumference 10-15 cm, weighing at 4-7 kg, red and in disorganised rows, medium oil content.
Kenen	Short with 2-8 branches, diameter 30-46 cm, 6-13 roots/branch, start to fruit in 16 months,	Medium size, length 1.1-1.6 m, width 4-8 cm, sparse thorns	Small with length of 35-44 cm and rounded the base circumference 35-44 cm, the edge circumference 10-15 cm, weighing at 4-7 kg, red and in disorganised rows, low oil content and savoury
Muni	Tall and branching, with 2-9 branches, diameter 40-56 cm, 12-60 roots/branch, start to fruit in 3 years	Big size, length 1.4-2.1 m, width 7-10 cm, thorns are not sharp	Medium to small with length of 50-73 cm, triangular, the base circumference 55-74 cm, the edge circumference 14-20 cm, weighing at 5-8 kg, reds and in disorganised rows, high oil content

Other accessions include Menjib Rumbai, Edewewits, Memeri, Monsrus, Monsor, cultivated in Manokwari and lowland regions. Hityom, Himbiak, Hibcau cultivated in Minyambow District, Manokwari, and highland regions.

== Nutrients and phytochemicals ==
Pandanus conoideus is a good source of Vitamin A with 130 μg of alpha-Carotene, 1980 μg beta-Carotene, and 1460 μg beta-cryptoxanthin. It is equally a good source of natural Vitamin E.

Oil makes up 35.93% of the fruit by weight. The fatty acid composition of the oil is: 79.92% oleic acid, 19.58% palmitoleic acid and 0.48% stearic acid.

Buah merah extract oil
Nutritional value per 100 g (3.5 oz)
- Energy: 3,631.71 kJ (868.00 kcal)
- Carbohydrates: 5.1 g
- Fat: 94.2 g
- Protein: 0 g
Vitamins and minerals
Vitamins	Quantity %DV^{†}
Vitamin A equiv. beta-Carotene lutein zeaxanthin	44% 396.25 μg 18% 1980 μg 0 μg
Vitamin E	141% 21.2 mg
Minerals	Quantity %DV^{†}
Sodium	0% 3 mg
- Other constituents: Quantity
- Water: 0.7 g
- ^{†}Percentages estimated using US recommendations for adults.

Oil constituent
Fatty acid	Type	Percentage of oil in extract	Percentage of oil in seeds
Oleic acid	Monounsaturated	51.53 %	40.90 %
Palmitic acid	Saturated	17.84 %	15.90 %
Linoleic acid	Polyunsaturated (omega-6)	3.15 %	5.26 %
Stearic acid	Saturated	2.4 %	2 %
Other Fatty acid	-	<1.5%	<1.5%
