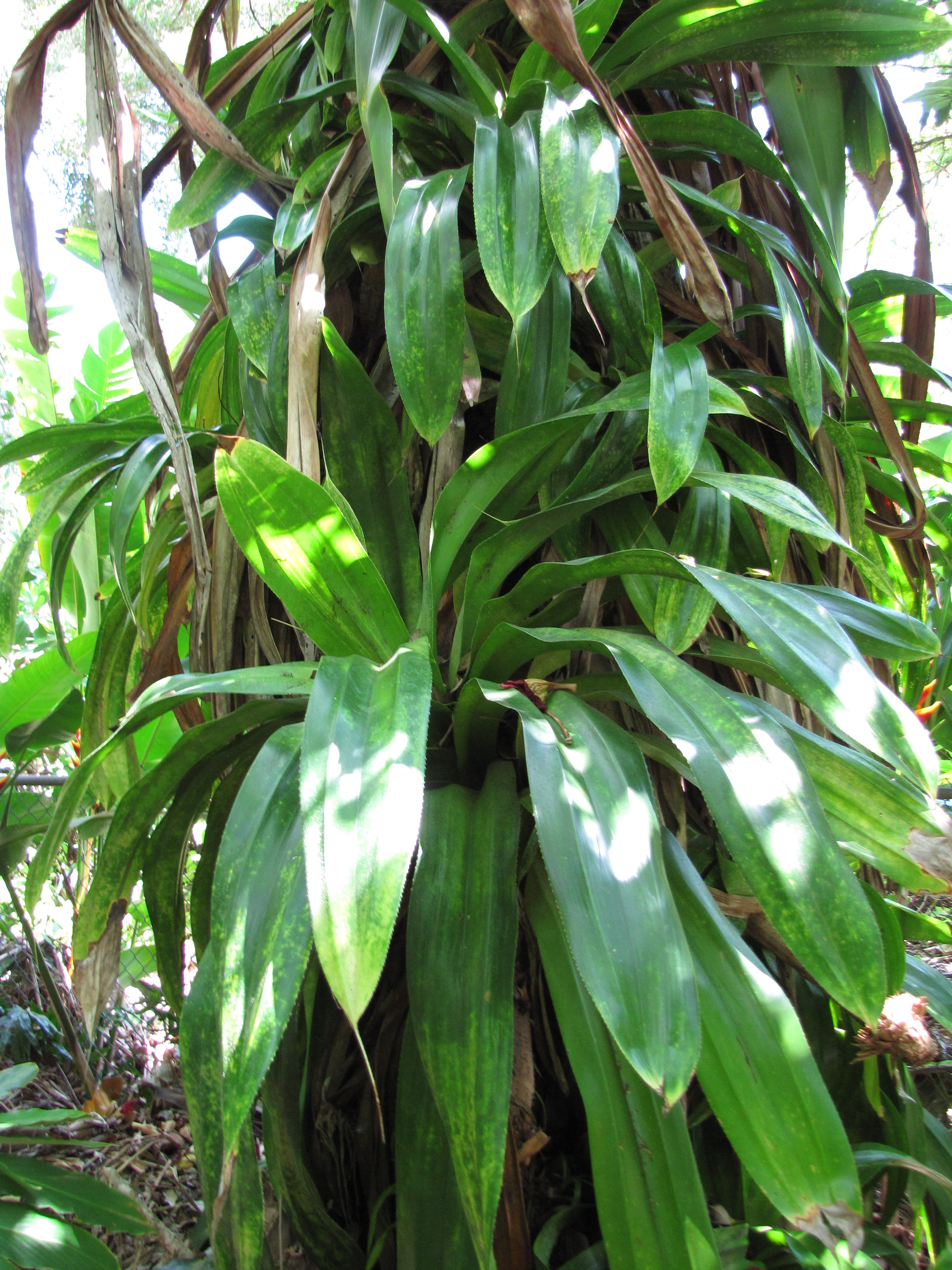

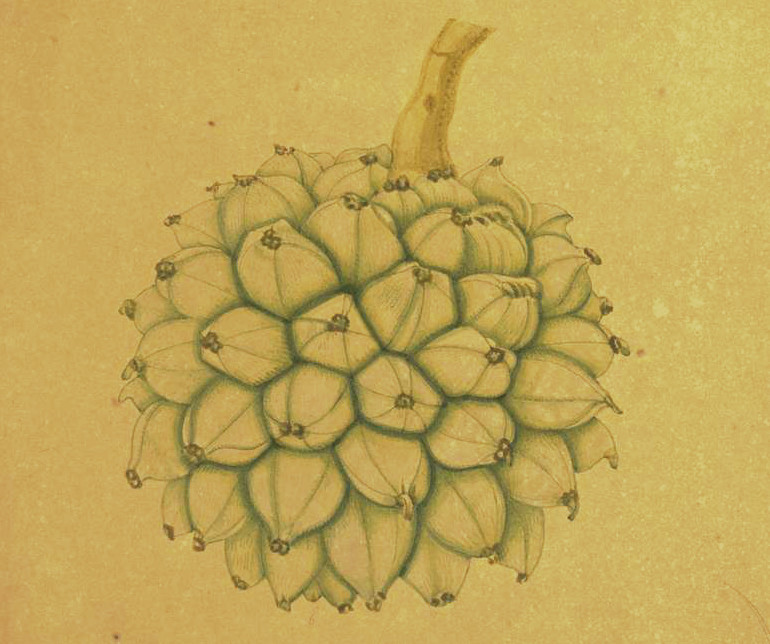

Conservation status
- Least Concern (IUCN 3.1)

Scientific classification
- Kingdom: Plantae
- Clade: Tracheophytes
- Clade: Angiosperms
- Clade: Monocots
- Order: Pandanales
- Family: Pandanaceae
- Genus: Pandanus
- Species: P. dubius

Binomial name
- Pandanus dubius Spreng.

Synonyms
- Barrotia gaudichaudii Brongn; Barrotia macrocarpa (Vieill.) Brongn.; Barrotia tetrodon Gaudich.; Hombronia edulis Gaudich.; Pandanus andamanensium Kurz; Pandanus bidoer Jungh.; Pandanus bidur Jungh. ex Miq.; Pandanus compressus Martelli; Pandanus hombronia F.Muell.; Pandanus kafu var. confluentus Kaneh.; Pandanus latifolius Perr.; Pandanus latissimus Blume ex Miq.; Pandanus macrocarpus Vieill.; Pandanus pacificus J.H.Veitch; Pandanus tetrodon (Gaudich.) Balf.f.; Pandanus yamagutii Kaneh.

= Pandanus dubius =

Species of plant

Pandanus dubius, commonly known as bakong or knob-fruited screwpine, is a species of Pandanus (screwpine) native to Island Southeast Asia, New Guinea, and the Western Pacific islands (Melanesia and Micronesia), and possibly also to the Andaman and Nicobar Islands.

== Taxonomy ==
Pandanus dubius was first described by the German botanist Kurt Polycarp Joachim Sprengel in 1826. It is classified in the subgenus Rykia, section Hombronia.

== Description ==
Bakong grows to about 3 to 10 m (9.8 to 32.8 ft) high with numerous thick prop roots and aerial roots. The leaves are lanceolate in shape with shallow serrations along the edges. The leaves are around 2 m (6.6 ft) long and 11 to 16 cm (4.3 to 6.3 in) wide, and dark green in color. Bakong are dioecious, having separate male and female plants. The fruits are globular in shape and are around 20 to 30 cm (7.9 to 11.8 in) in diameter.

== Habitat ==
Bakong typically grows on beaches, rocky areas, and limestone outcrops in coastal ecosystems.

== Uses ==
Like other species of pandanus, the leaves of bakong are commonly harvested for weaving mats and other handicrafts in the Philippines, Halmahera, the Bismarck Archipelago, and the Solomon Islands. Fibers from the roots can also be made into ropes or twine.

The white seeds are edible and taste like coconuts. The flesh of the fruits can also be cooked and eaten. They are eaten in Guam, the Philippines, and Rota Island. Bakong are also commonly cultivated as ornamentals.

== Gallery ==
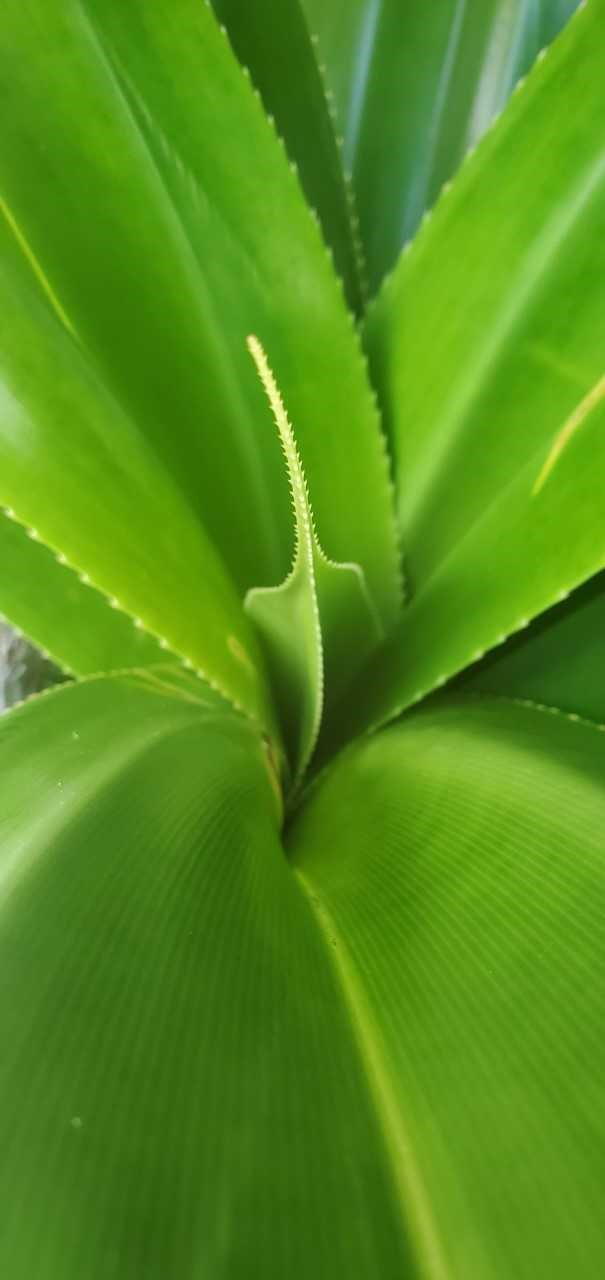
Emergent leaf

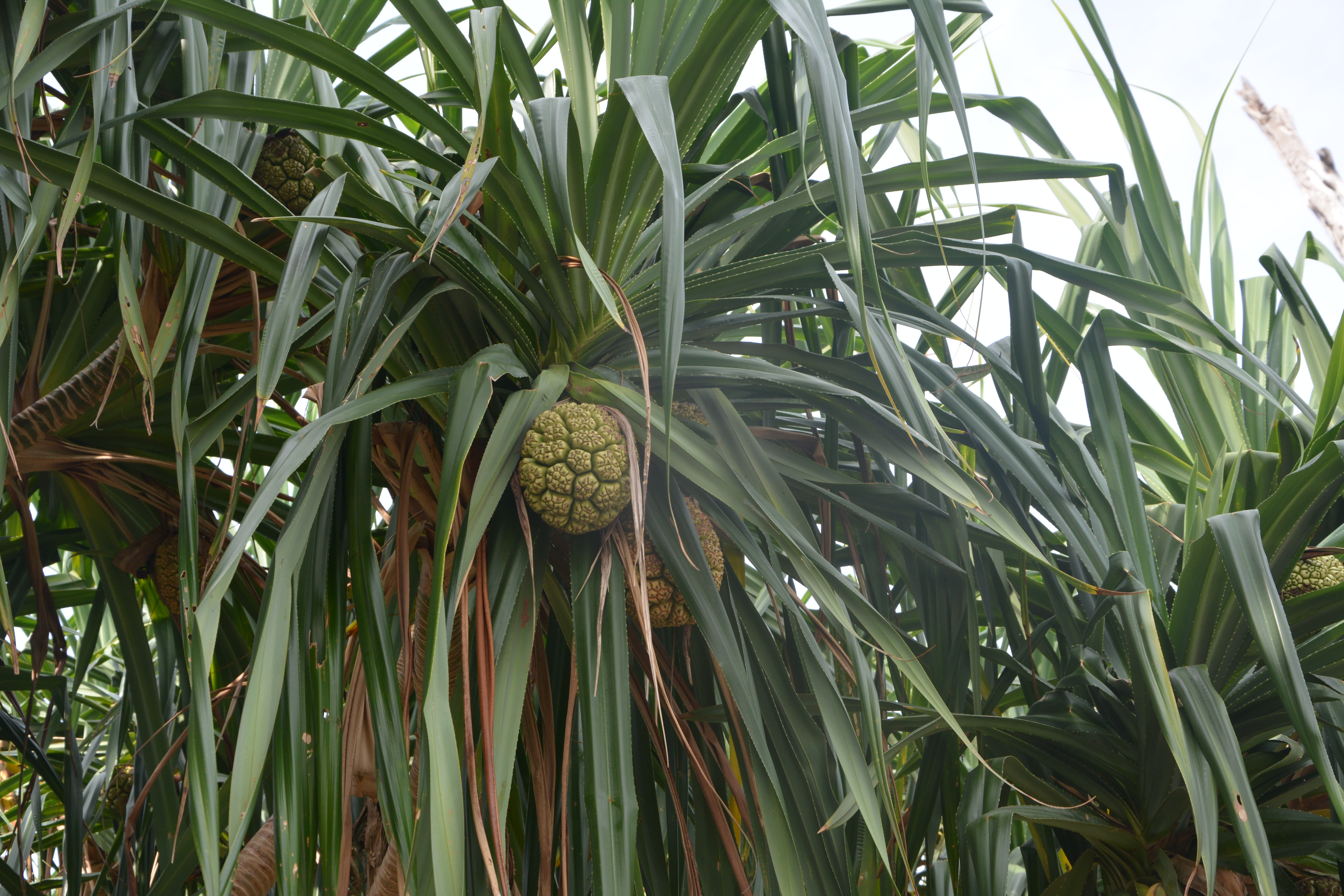
Leaves and fruit

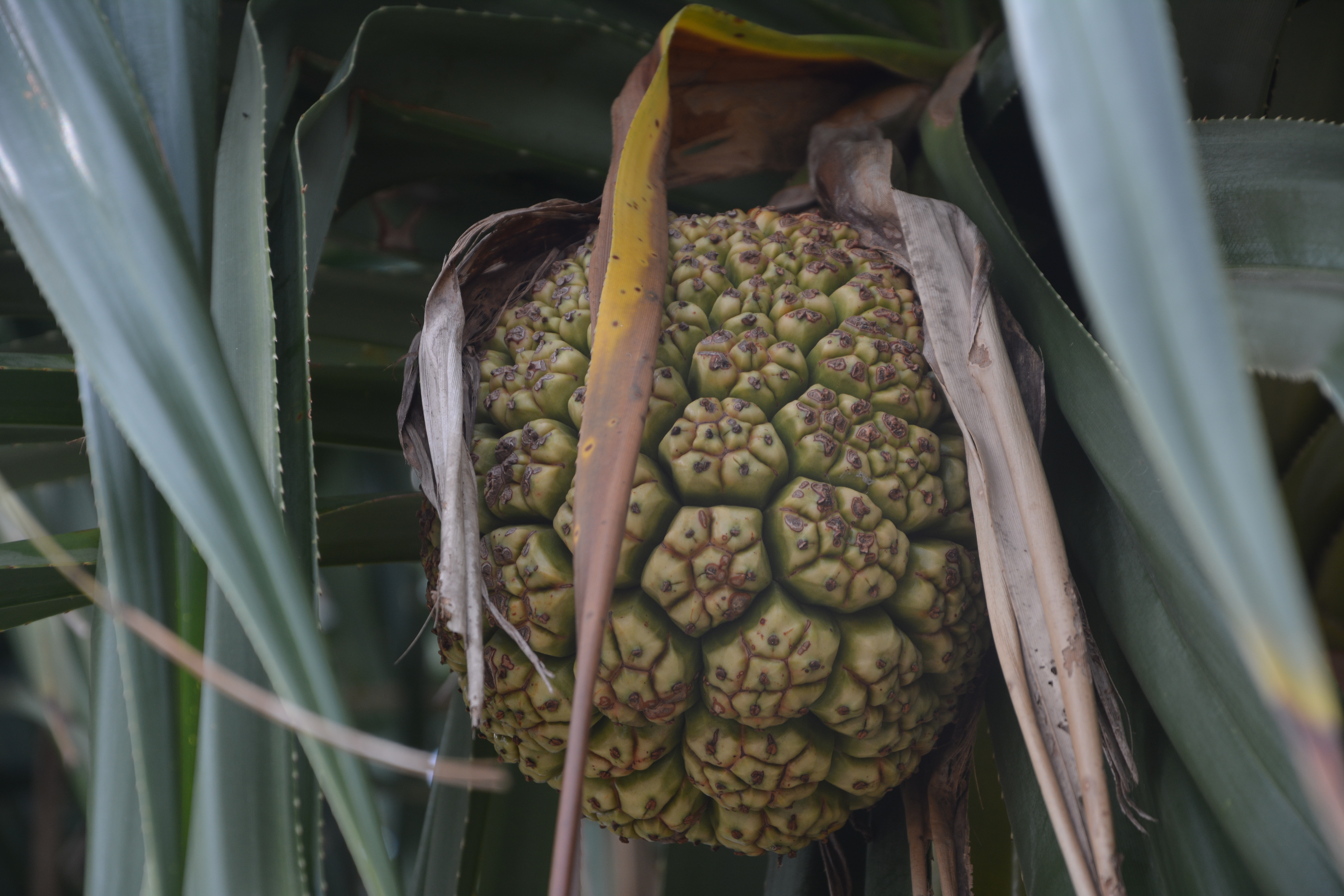
Fruit

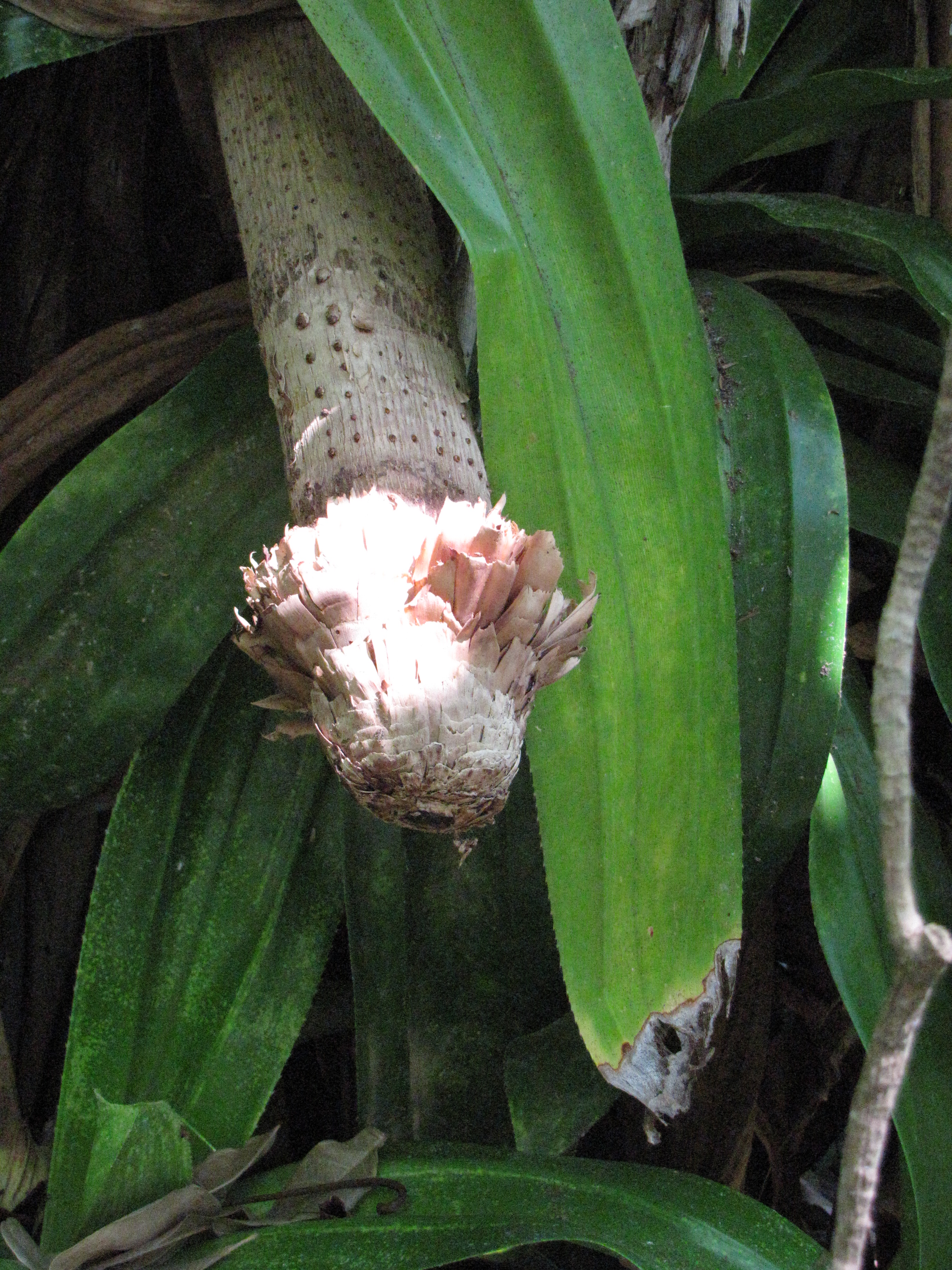
Aerial root

== See also ==
- Pandanus amaryllifolius
- Pandanus odoratissimus
- Pandanus utilis
- Domesticated plants and animals of Austronesia
