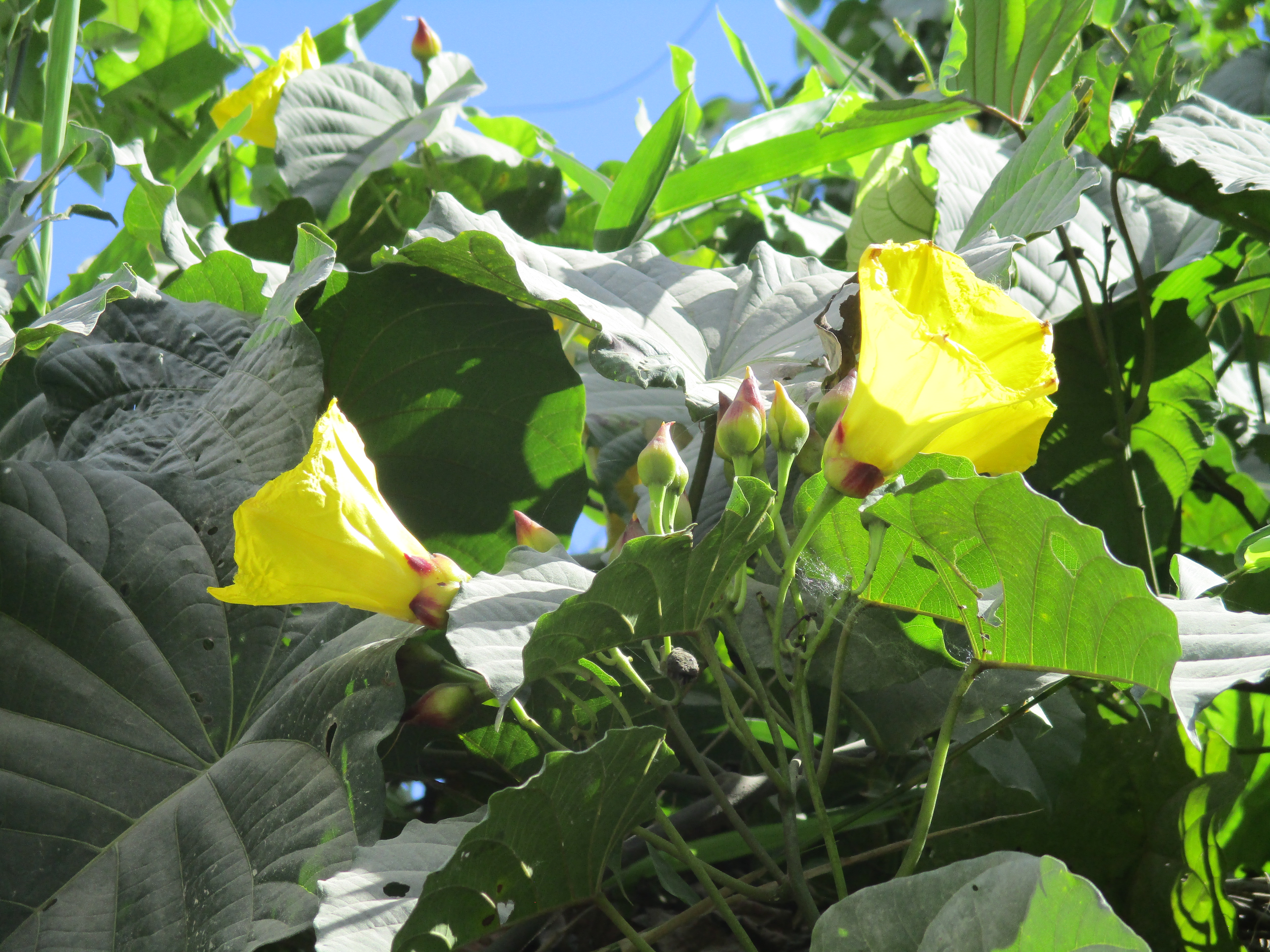
- In Sulawesi, Indonesia

Scientific classification
- Kingdom: Plantae
- Clade: Embryophytes
- Clade: Tracheophytes
- Clade: Angiosperms
- Clade: Eudicots
- Clade: Asterids
- Order: Solanales
- Family: Convolvulaceae
- Genus: Decalobanthus
- Species: D. peltatus

Binomial name
- Decalobanthus peltatus (L.) A.R.Simões & Staples

Synonyms
- Convolvulus peltatus L.; Ipomoea nymphaeifolia Blume; Merremia peltata (L.) Merr.

= Decalobanthus peltatus =

Species of flowering plant

Decalobanthus peltatus is a species of flowering vine in the morning glory family, Convolvulaceae, that is native to Pemba Island, the Mascarene Islands, Madagascar, the Seychelles, Indonesia, Malaysia, the Philippines, northern Queensland (Australia) and French Polynesia. It has been introduced and subsequently become invasive on some of the other Pacific islands, such as New Caledonia, Samoa, Fiji, Solomon Islands, and Palau.

As an invasive species in island habitats, Decalobanthus peltatus can completely cover trees, smothering and killing large areas of native forest; the resulting death of trees and loss of forests can cause less food for native birds and fruit bats and can also increase soil erosion, leading to increased sedimentation and death of coral reefs.

For eradication of invasive populations, cutting the vines at the base will kill the tops and allow trees to recover. The vines will re-grow from the base, so it is best to uproot them if possible, but repeated cutting will exhaust and eventually kill the vines. The vine's seeds will not germinate in the shade, so the best way to prevent invasive problems with this vine is to keep native forest intact.

In Palau, where it is locally referred to by the name kebeas, public efforts have been taken to promote physical fitness and ecology by encouraging the community to use machetes to cut the vine.
