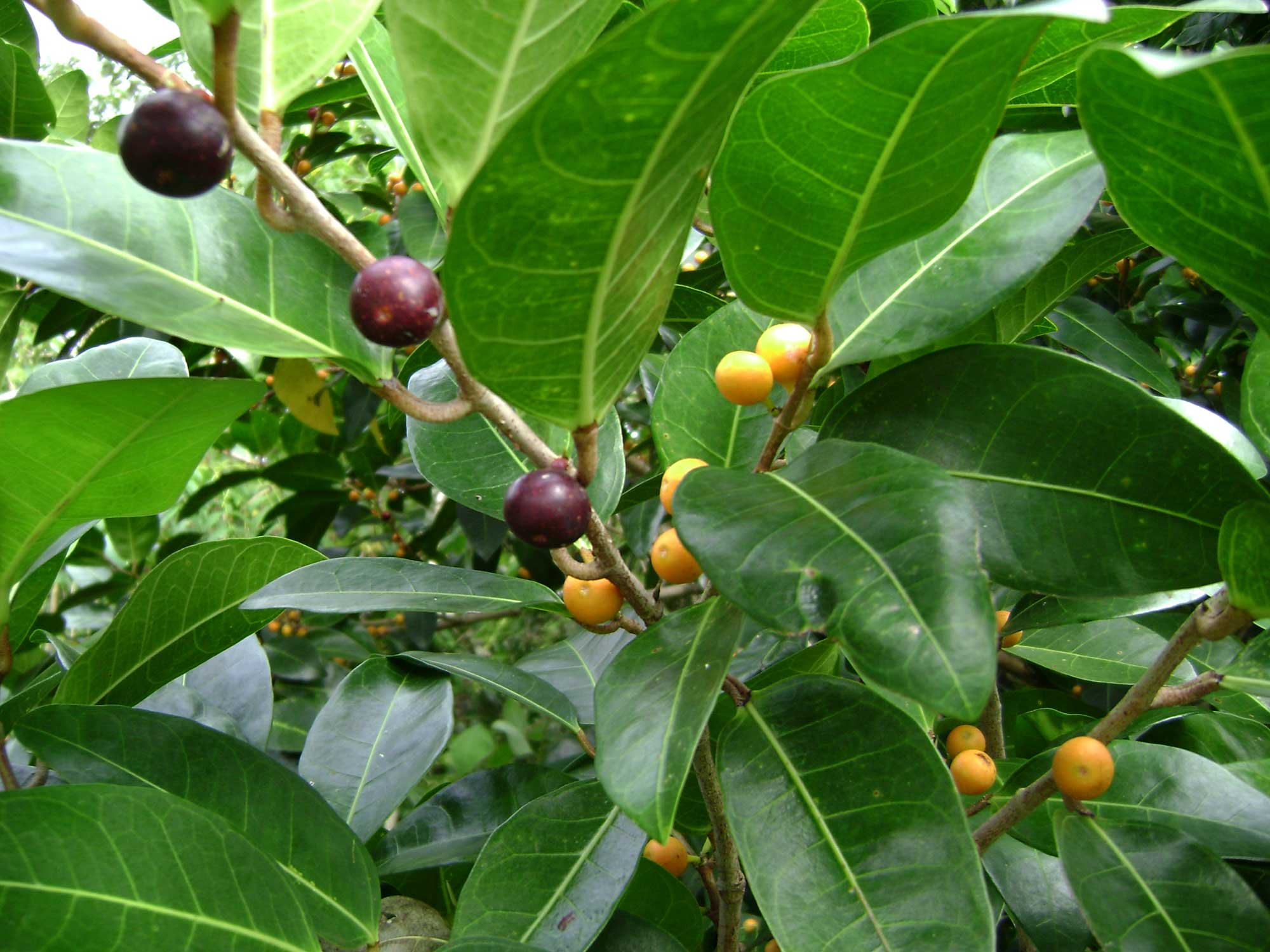

Conservation status
- Least Concern (IUCN 3.1)

Scientific classification
- Kingdom: Plantae
- Clade: Tracheophytes
- Clade: Angiosperms
- Clade: Eudicots
- Clade: Rosids
- Order: Rosales
- Family: Moraceae
- Genus: Ficus
- Subgenus: F. subg. Sycidium
- Species: F. tinctoria

Binomial name
- Ficus tinctoria G.Forst.

Subspecies
- Ficus tinctoria subsp. gibbosa (Blume) Corner; Ficus tinctoria subsp. tinctoria

Synonyms
- List: synonyms of subsp. gibbosa: Ficus gibbosa Blume in Bijdr.; Ficus parasitica subsp. gibbosa (Blume) M.R.Almeida; Ficus tinctoria var. gibbosa (Blume) Corner; Ficus ampelos J.Koenig ex Roxb., nom. illeg. homonym. post.; Ficus angustata Miq.; Ficus clarkei King; Ficus cuneata Blume; Ficus cuspidifera Miq.; Ficus dodonaeifolia Zipp. ex Miq.; Ficus excelsa Vahl; Ficus gibbosa var. cuneata (Blume) Miq.; Ficus gibbosa var. cuspidifera (Miq.) King; Ficus gibbosa f. cuspidifera (Miq.) King; Ficus gibbosa var. dodonaeifolia Miq.; Ficus gibbosa var. latifolia Miq.; Ficus gibbosa f. parasitica (J.Koenig ex Willd.) King; Ficus gibbosa var. parasitica (J.Koenig ex Willd.) King; Ficus gibbosa var. rigida Miq.; Ficus gibbosa f. tuberculata (Roxb.) King; Ficus gibbosa var. tuberculata (Roxb.) King; Ficus gibbosa var. unigibba Miq.; Ficus irregularis Steud.; Ficus paradoxa Blume; Ficus parasitica J.Koenig ex Willd.; Ficus parasitica var. cuspidifera (Miq.) M.R.Almeida; Ficus parasitica var. tuberculata (Roxb.) M.R.Almeida; Ficus pereng Steud.; Ficus pervia Miq.; Ficus platypoda var. angustata (Miq.) Corner; Ficus pseudobotryoides H.Lév. & Vaniot; Ficus reticulata Thunb.; Ficus rhomboidalis H.Lév. & Vaniot, nom. illeg. homonym. post.; Ficus rhomboidalis Vahl; Ficus rigida Blume, nom. illeg. homonym. post.; Ficus rigida Jack; Ficus scabriuscula Buch.-Ham. ex Sm.; Ficus sclerophylla Roxb.; Ficus subobliqua Miq.; Ficus subobliqua var. latiuscula Miq.; Ficus tinctoria var. cuspidifera (Miq.) Chithra; Ficus tinctoria subsp. parasitica (J.Koenig ex Willd.) Corner; Ficus tinctoria var. parasitica (J.Koenig ex Willd.) Corner; Ficus tinctoria var. rigida (Miq.) Corner; Ficus tuberculata Roxb.; Ficus volubilis (Dalzell & A.Gibson) King, nom. illeg. homonym. post.; Urostigma ampelos Dalzell & A.Gibson; Urostigma volubile Dalzell & A.Gibson synonyms of subsp. tinctoria: Ficus altimeraloo Roxb. ex Miq.; Ficus altimeraloo var. laeta (Decne.) Miq.; Ficus antoniana Elmer; Ficus chlorosykon Rech.; Ficus excelsa (Miq.) Miq, nom. illeg. homonym. post.; Ficus fenicis Merr.; Ficus laeta Decne.; Ficus michelii H.Lév.; Ficus neoehudarum Summerh.; Ficus reticulosa Miq.; Ficus swinhoei King; Ficus tinctoria var. neoehudarum (Summerh.) Fosberg; Ficus tinctoria subsp. swinhoei (King) Corner; Ficus validinervis F.Muell. ex Benth.; Urostigma excelsum Miq.

= Ficus tinctoria =

Dye fig

Species of fig

Ficus tinctoria, also known as dye fig, or humped fig is a hemiepiphytic tree in the genus Ficus. It is also one of the species known as a strangler fig.

It is found in Asia, Malesia, northern Australia, and the South Pacific islands. It grows in moist valleys.

Palms are favorable host species. Root systems of dye fig can come together to be self-sustaining, but the epiphyte usually falls if the host tree dies or rots away.

In Australia it is recorded as a medium-sized tree with smooth, oval green leaves. It is found often growing in rocky areas or over boulders. The leaves are asymmetrical.

The small rust-brown fruit of the dye fig are the source of a red dye used in traditional fabric making in parts of Oceania and Indonesia.

The fruit is also edible and constitute as a major food source in the low-lying atolls of Micronesia and Polynesia.

== Subspecies ==
Two subspecies are accepted:

- Ficus tinctoria subsp. gibbosa (Blume) Corner
- Ficus tinctoria subsp. tinctoria

== Gallery ==
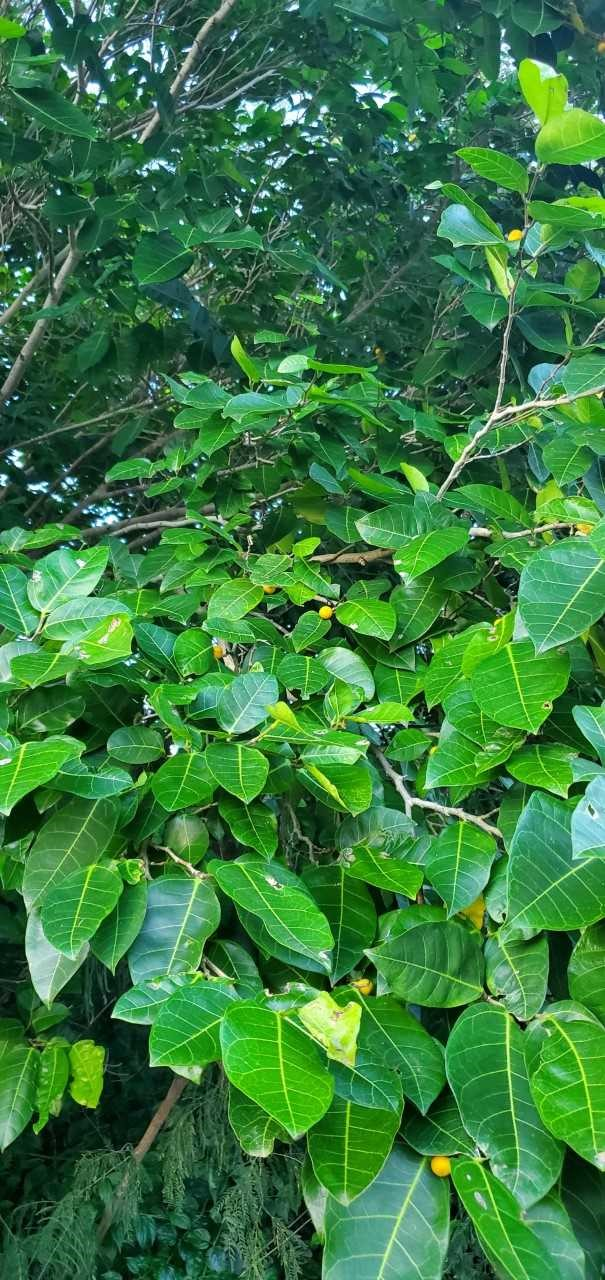
Leaves and mature fruit

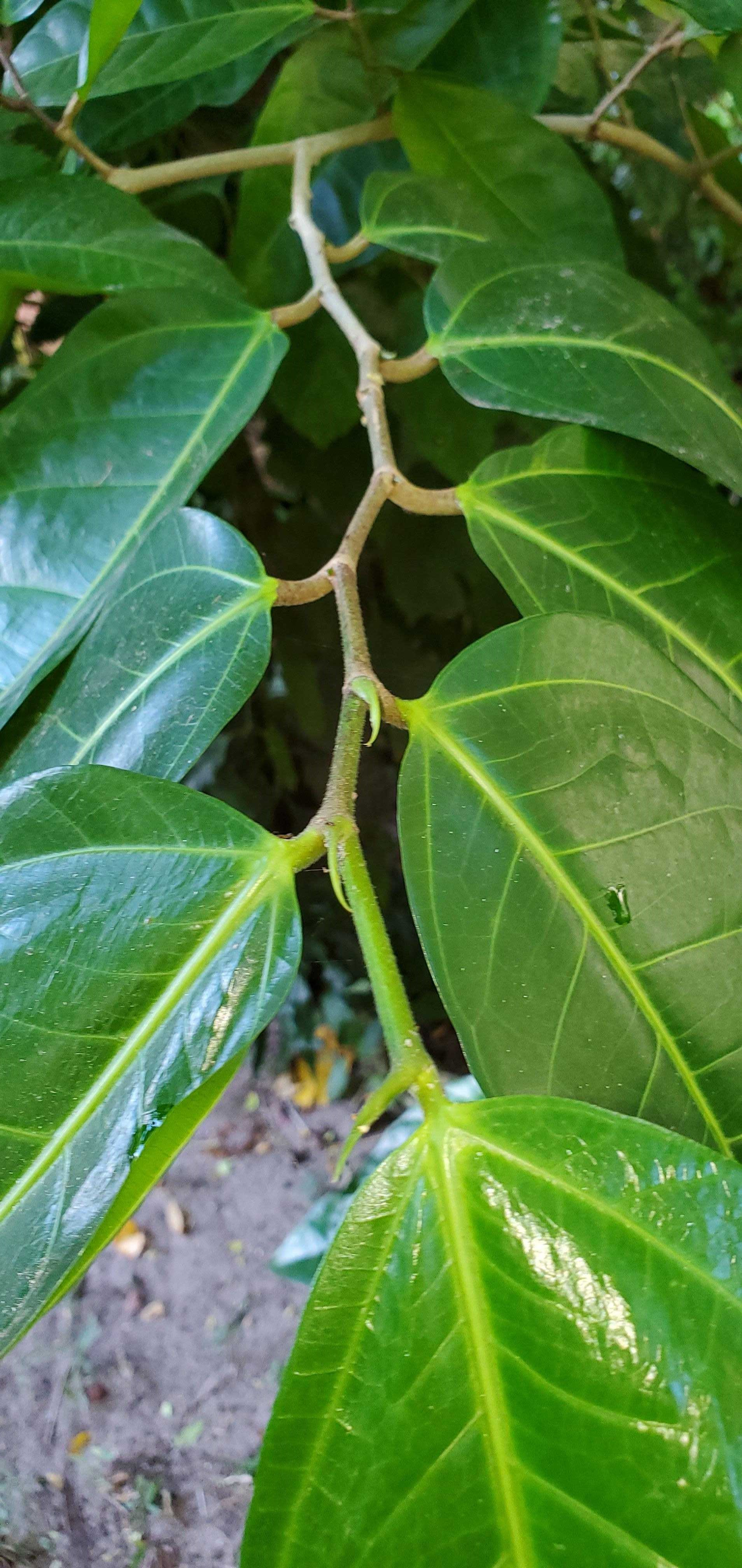
Branch leaf pattern

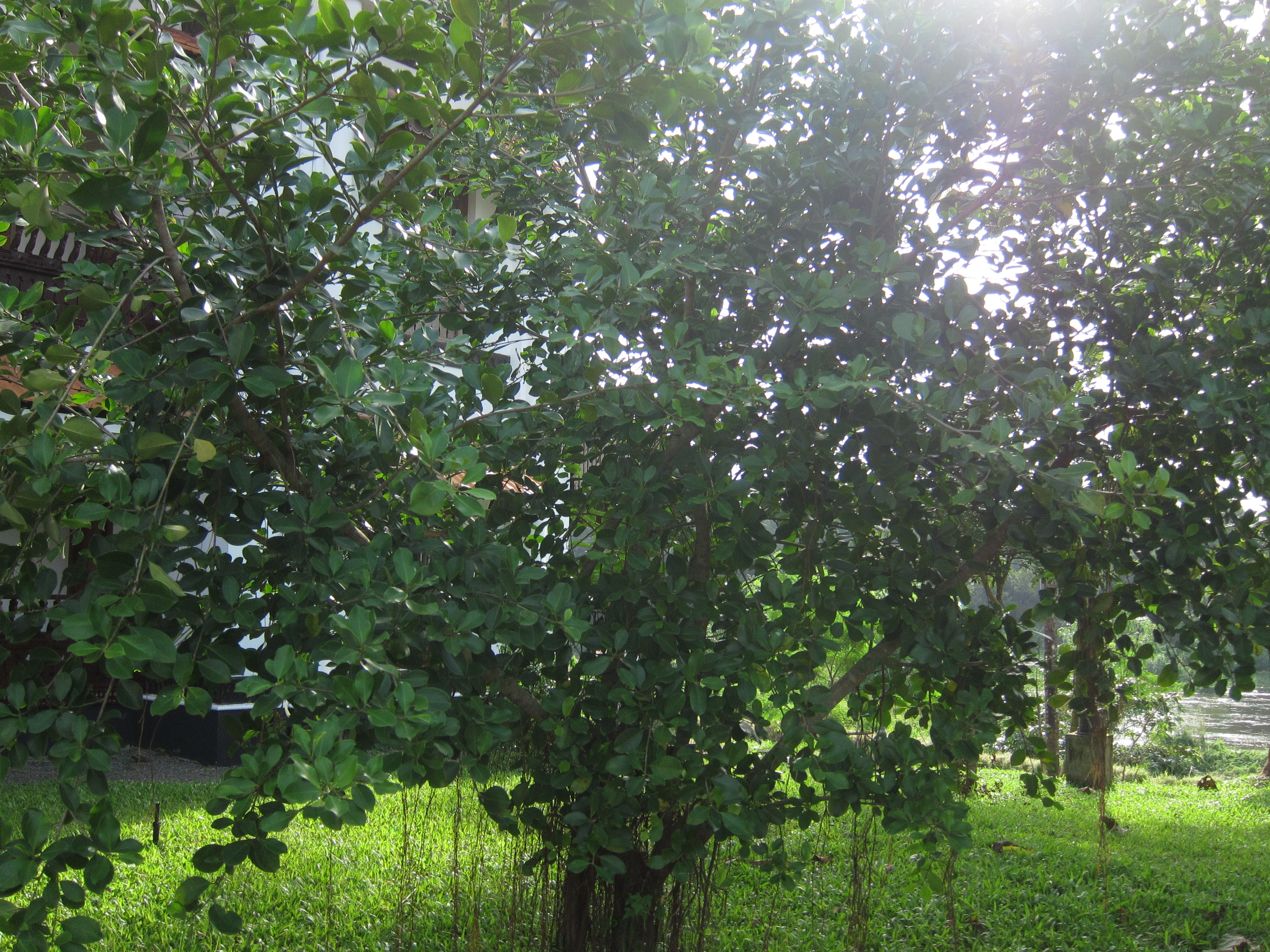
Mature tree

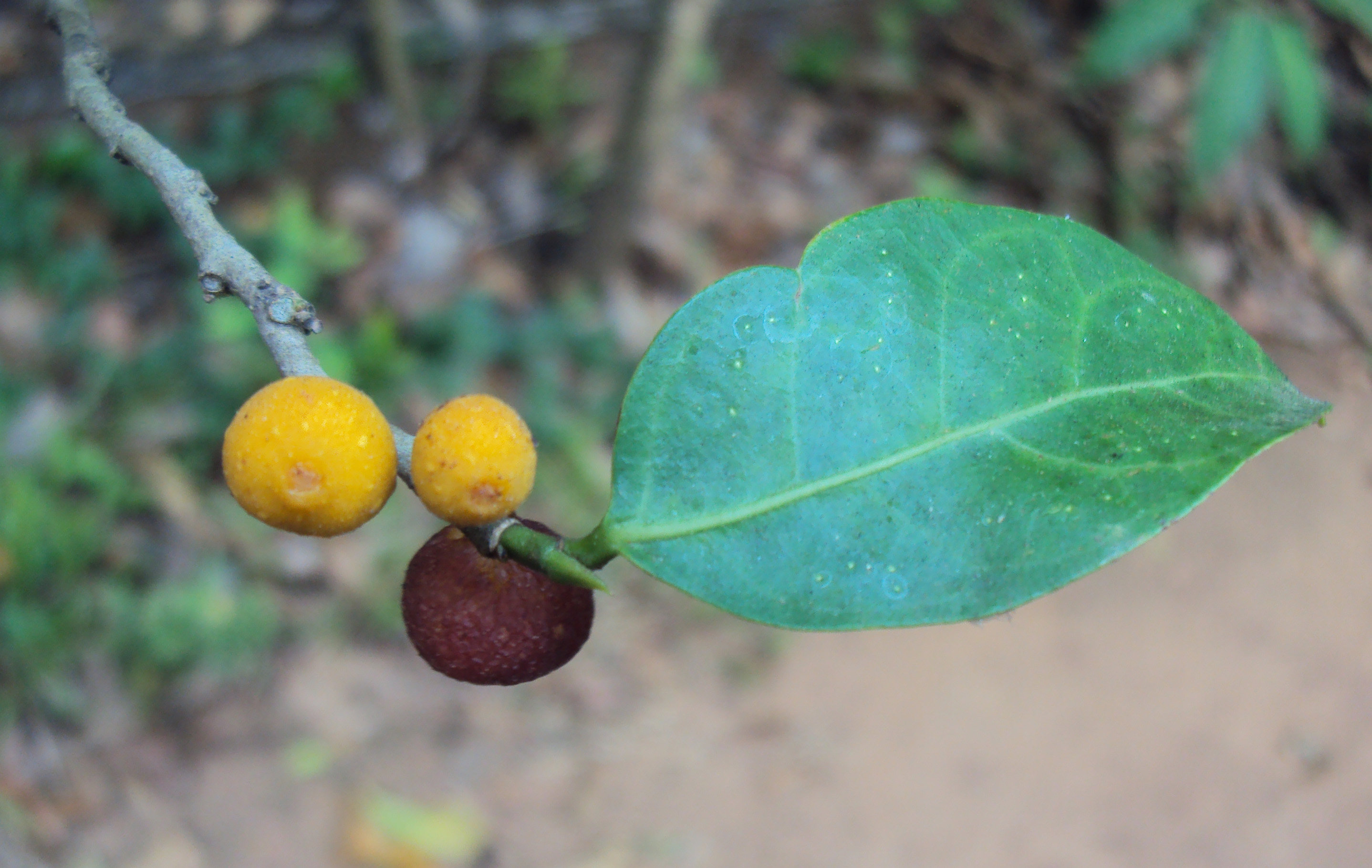
Fruits, asymmetric leaf with vein offset to one side.
