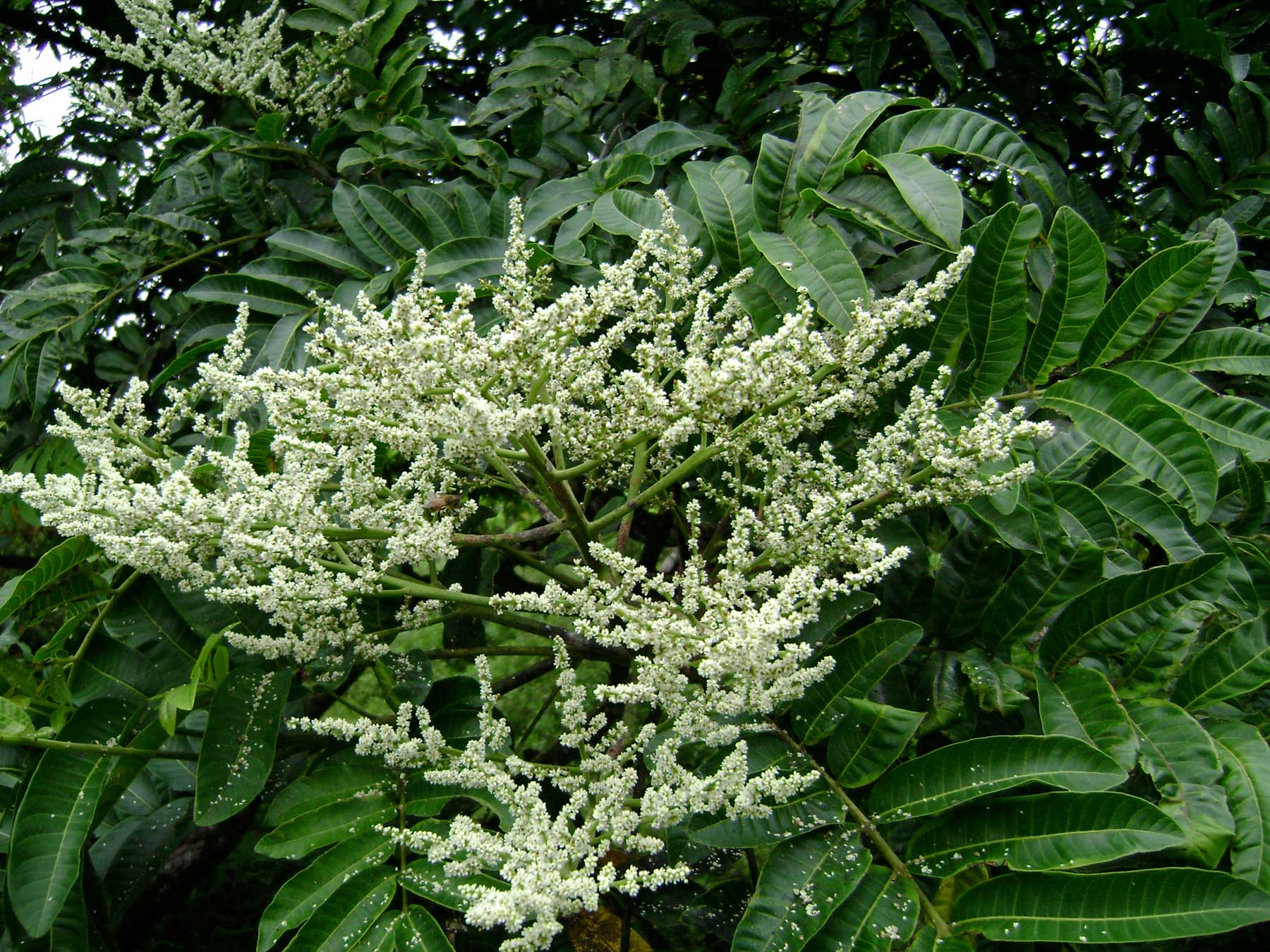

Conservation status
- Least Concern (IUCN 3.1)

Scientific classification
- Kingdom: Plantae
- Clade: Embryophytes
- Clade: Tracheophytes
- Clade: Angiosperms
- Clade: Eudicots
- Clade: Rosids
- Order: Sapindales
- Family: Anacardiaceae
- Genus: Rhus
- Species: R. taitensis

Binomial name
- Rhus taitensis Guill.

Synonyms
- 14 synonyms: Duckera taitensis (Guill.) F.A.Barkley; Rhus simarubifolia var. taitensis (Guill.) Engl.; Melanochyla tomentosa Engl.; Melanococca tomentosa Blume; Rhus engleriana Warb.; Rhus ferruginea Teijsm. & Binn. ex Engl.; Rhus panaciformis F.Muell.; Rhus retusa Zoll. ex Teijsm. & Binn.; Rhus retusa var. blumei Engl.; Rhus rufa Teijsm. & Binn.; Rhus simarubifolia A.Gray; Toxicodendron retusum (Zoll. ex Teijsm. & Binn.) Kuntze; Toxicodendron simarubifolia (A.Gray) Kuntze; Otonychium retusum Miq.

= Rhus taitensis =

Species of plant in the cashew family

Rhus taitensis is a small tree or shrub in the mango family Anacardiaceae. It is found from tropical Asia, to Australia and many islands of the Pacific Ocean. The chemical tetrahydroxysqualene from dried and ground parts of R. taitensis has in vitro activity against Mycobacterium tuberculosis and the plant has been used in folk medicine locally to treat diarrhea and hearing loss.

== Distribution ==
The native range of R. taitensis includes Asian countries, such as Indonesia (Sulawesi, Irian Jaya, eastern Java, the Lesser Sunda Islands and the Moluccas), Malaysia, Papua New Guinea, and the Philippines; western and south central Pacific island locales, such as the Society Islands of French Polynesia (the type specimens were collected from the island of Tahiti by Carlo Luigi Giuseppe Bertero and J. A. Moerenhout during an expedition described in Moerenhout's book entitled Voyages aux îles du Grand Océan), Niue, Palau and others within Micronesia, and the Solomon Islands; and Australia (in northeastern Queensland).
