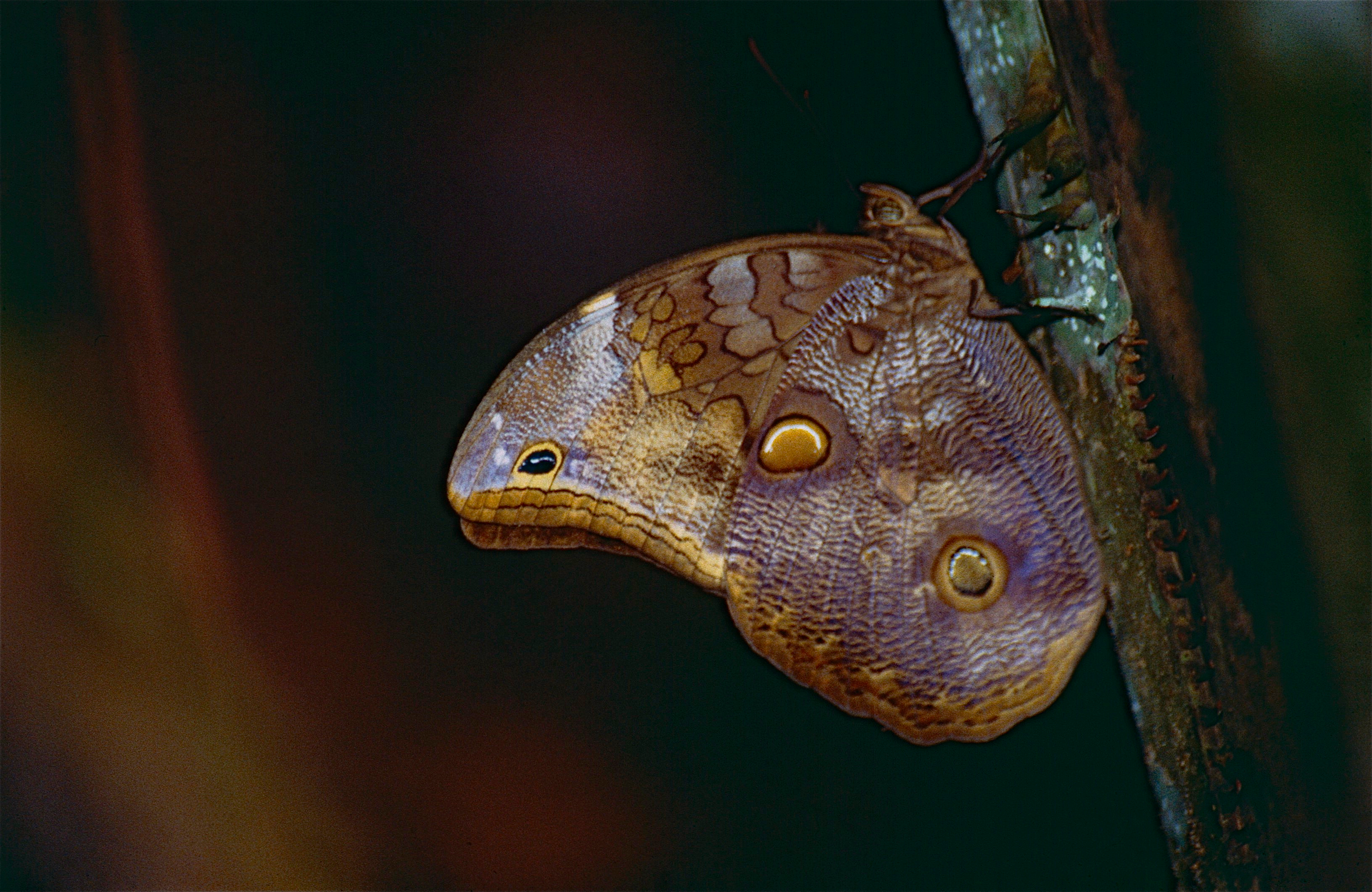
- Catoblepia xanthus

Scientific classification
- Kingdom: Animalia
- Phylum: Arthropoda
- Class: Insecta
- Order: Lepidoptera
- Family: Nymphalidae
- Subfamily: Satyrinae
- Tribe: Brassolini; Boisduval, 1836

Subtribes
- Biina (but see text); Brassolina; Naropina

Synonyms
- Brassolidae; Brassolinae

= Brassolini =

Butterfly tribe of disputed placement

Brassolini is a tribe usually placed in the brush-footed butterfly subfamily Morphinae, which is often included in the Satyrinae as a tribe Morphini. If this is accepted, the Brassolini become the sister tribe of the Morphini among the Satyrinae. Formerly, they were treated as an independent family Brassolidae or subfamily Brassolinae. Many members of this tribe are called owl butterflies.

The Brassolini is a Neotropical butterfly group that currently includes 102 species and contain 17 genera in two or three subtribes, depending whether the enigmatic genus Bia is assigned here as sister to all other lineages in the group. The other genera are divided into one small subtribe, and a larger one that unites the bulk of the genera.

The use of adult characters produces a more robustly supported phylogeny of the Brassolini than does the use of characters from immature life stages.

== Genera ==
Genera are listed in the presumed phylogenetic sequence.

Subtribe Biina (tentatively placed here)

- Bia

Subtribe Naropina

- Aponarope
- Narope

Subtribe Brassolina

- Brassolis
- Dynastor
- Dasyophthalma
- Opoptera (= Mimoblepia)
- Caligo – giant owl butterflies
- Caligopsis
- Eryphanis
- Selenophanes
- Penetes
- Catoblepia
- Mielkella
- Orobrassolis
- Blepolenis
- Opsiphanes
