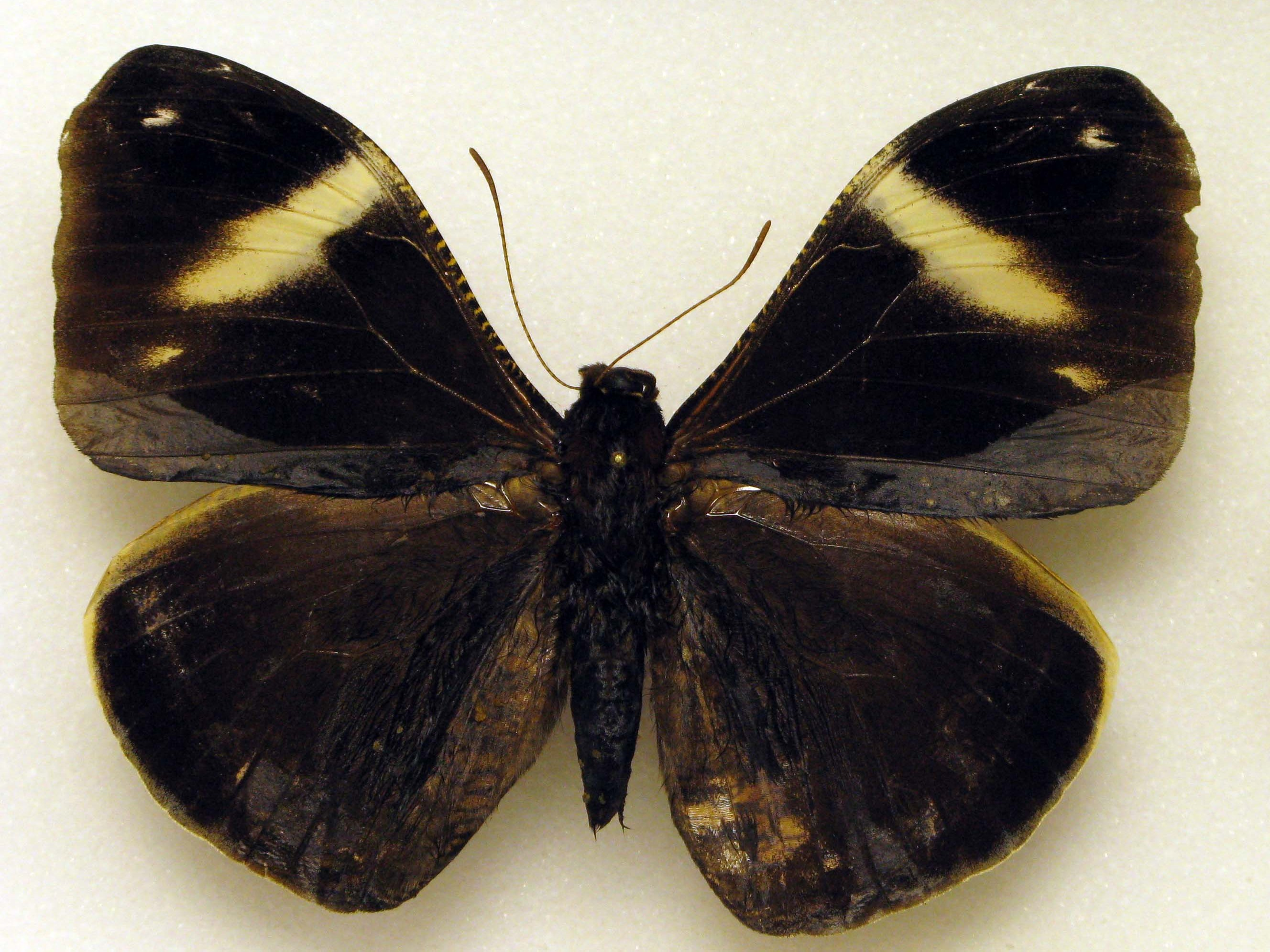
- Dynastor macrosiris

Scientific classification
- Domain: Eukaryota
- Kingdom: Animalia
- Phylum: Arthropoda
- Class: Insecta
- Order: Lepidoptera
- Family: Nymphalidae
- Tribe: Brassolini
- Genus: Dynastor; Doubleday, 1849

Type species
- Dynastor napoleon Doubleday, 1849

Diversity
- 3

Synonyms
- Megastes Westwood ,1851

= Dynastor =

Genus of brush-footed butterflies

Dynastor is a genus of butterflies in the family Nymphalidae. Members of the genus can be found from Mexico to Central and South America.

It consists of three species which feed on Bromeliaceae species. These are the only nymphalid species that do so.

== Species ==
- Dynastor darius (Fabricius, 1775)
- Dynastor macrosiris (Westwood, 1851)
- Dynastor napoleon Doubleday, [1849]
