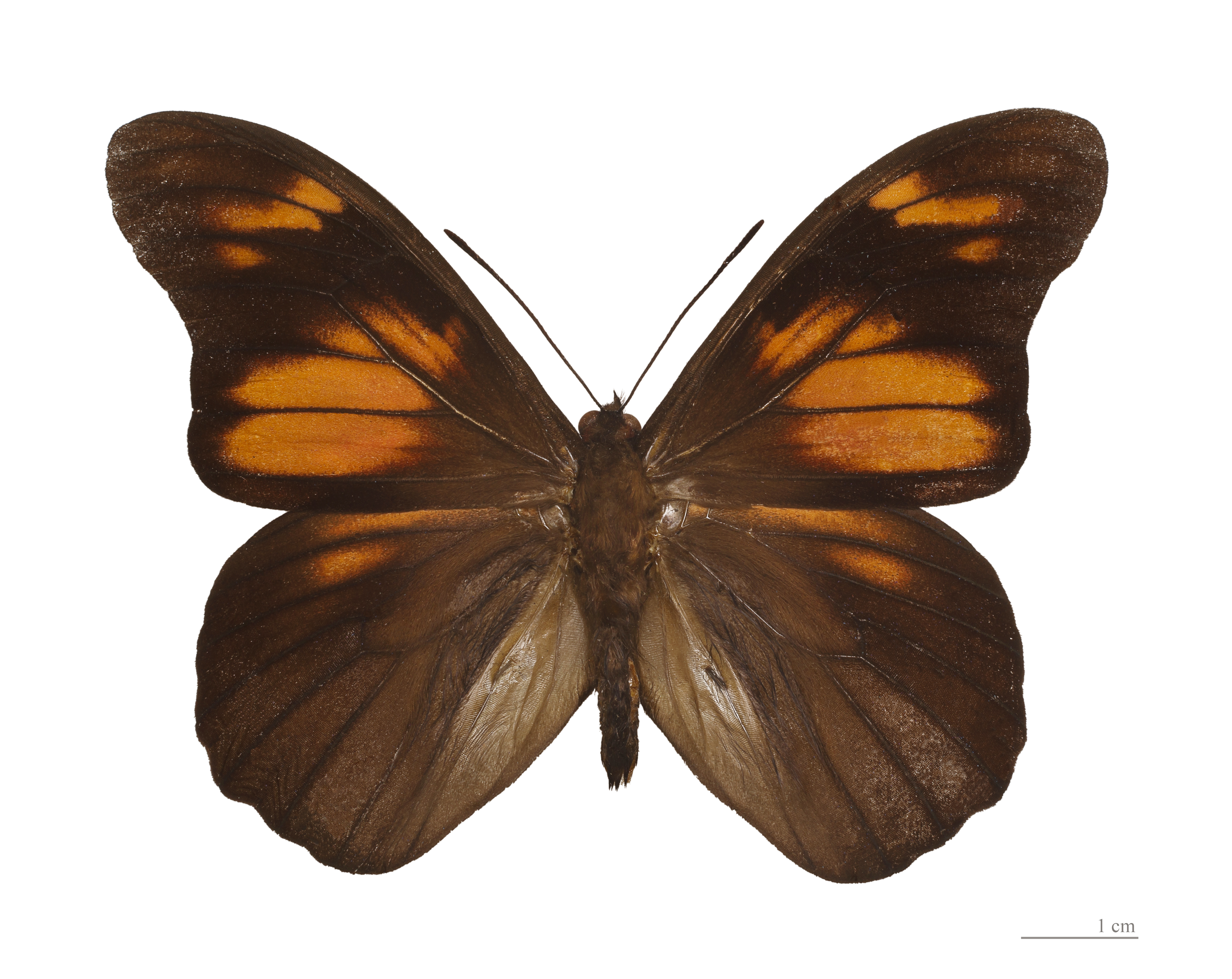
- MHNT
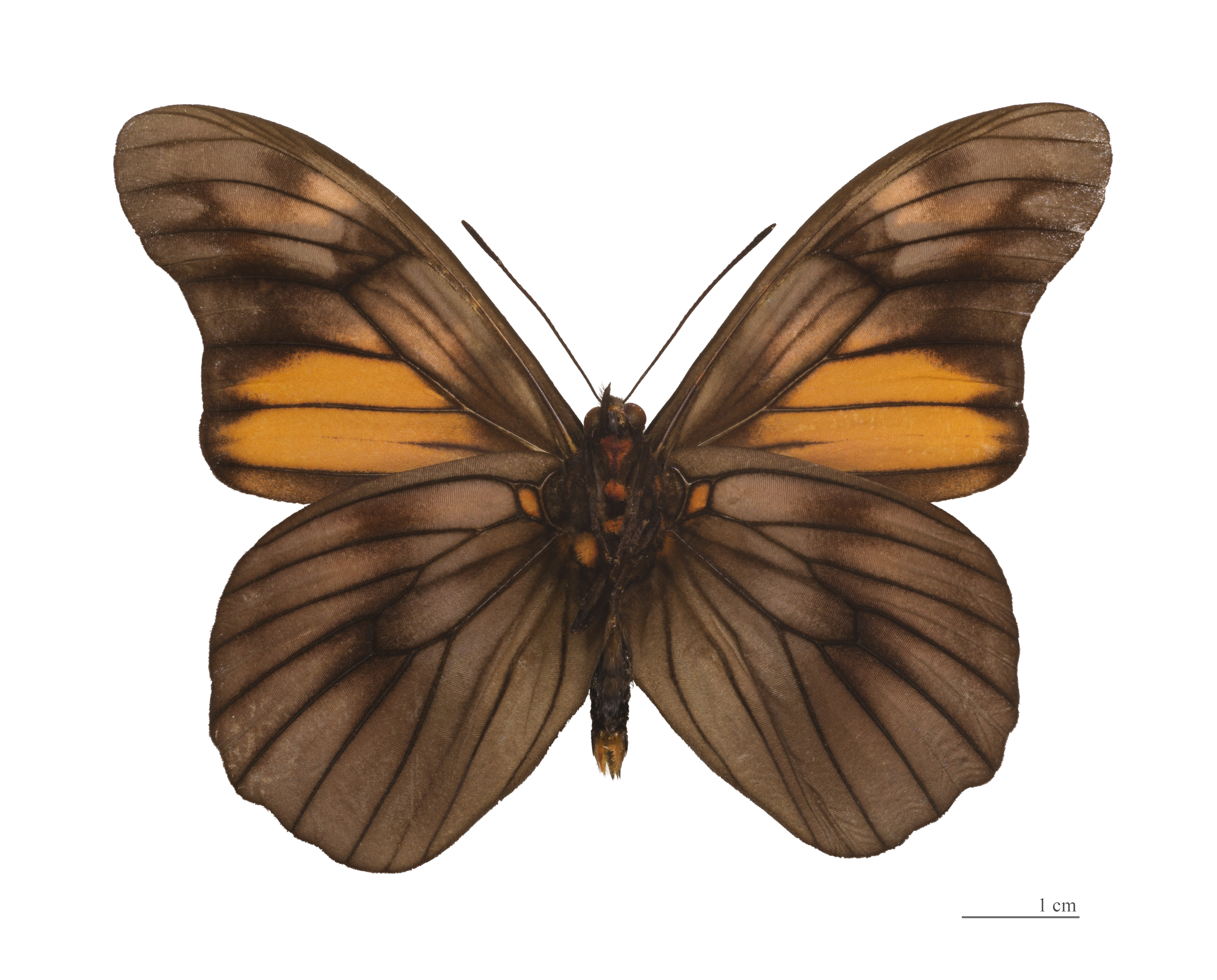
- Underside - MHNT

Scientific classification
- Domain: Eukaryota
- Kingdom: Animalia
- Phylum: Arthropoda
- Class: Insecta
- Order: Lepidoptera
- Family: Nymphalidae
- Tribe: Brassolini
- Genus: Penetes; Doubleday, [1849]
- Species: P. pamphanis

Binomial name
- Penetes pamphanis Doubleday, [1849]

= Penetes =

Penetes pamphanis

Monotypic brush-footed butterfly genus

Penetes is a monotypic butterfly genus in the family Nymphalidae. Its single species Penetes pamphanis is a large butterfly native to south-eastern Brazil.
