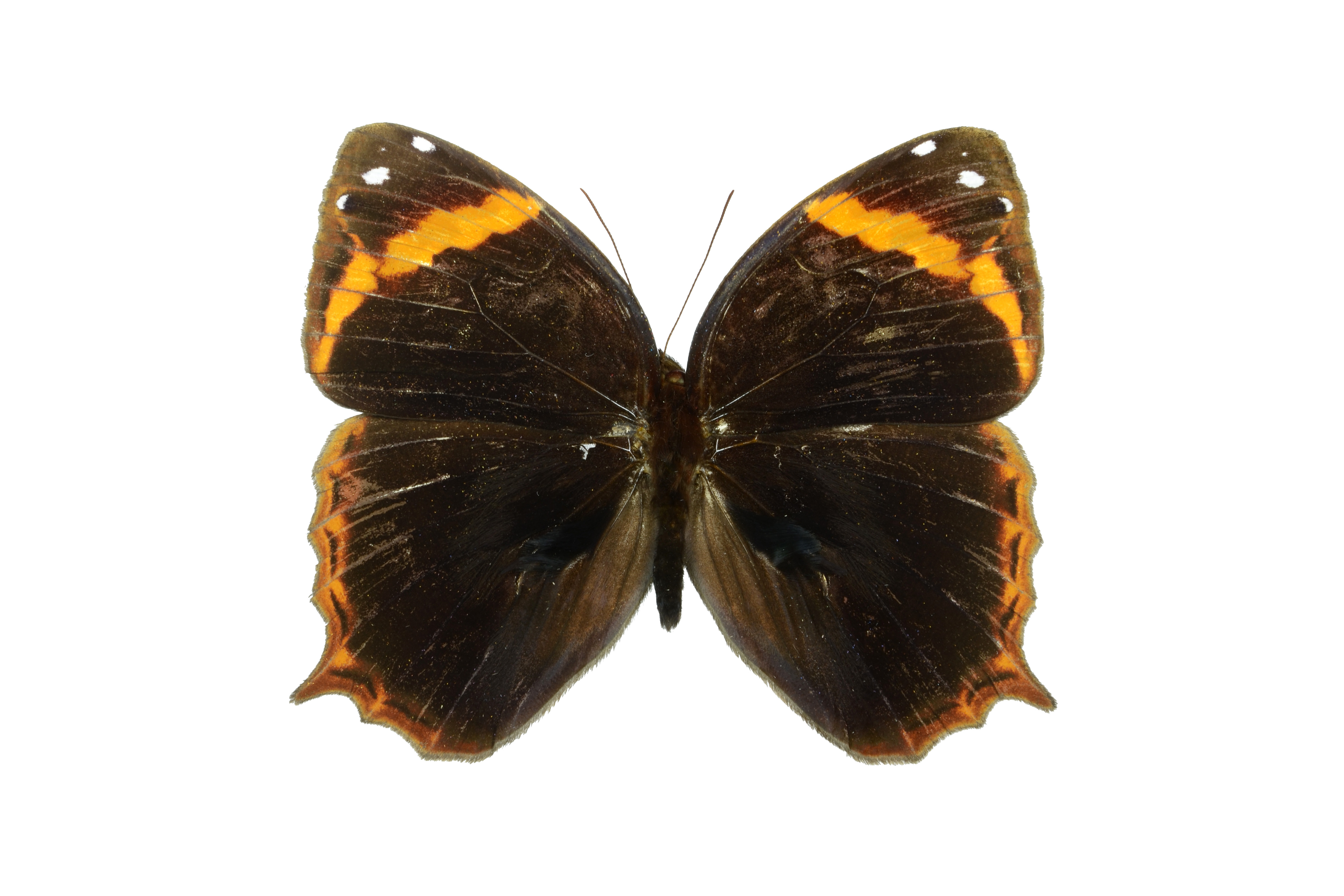

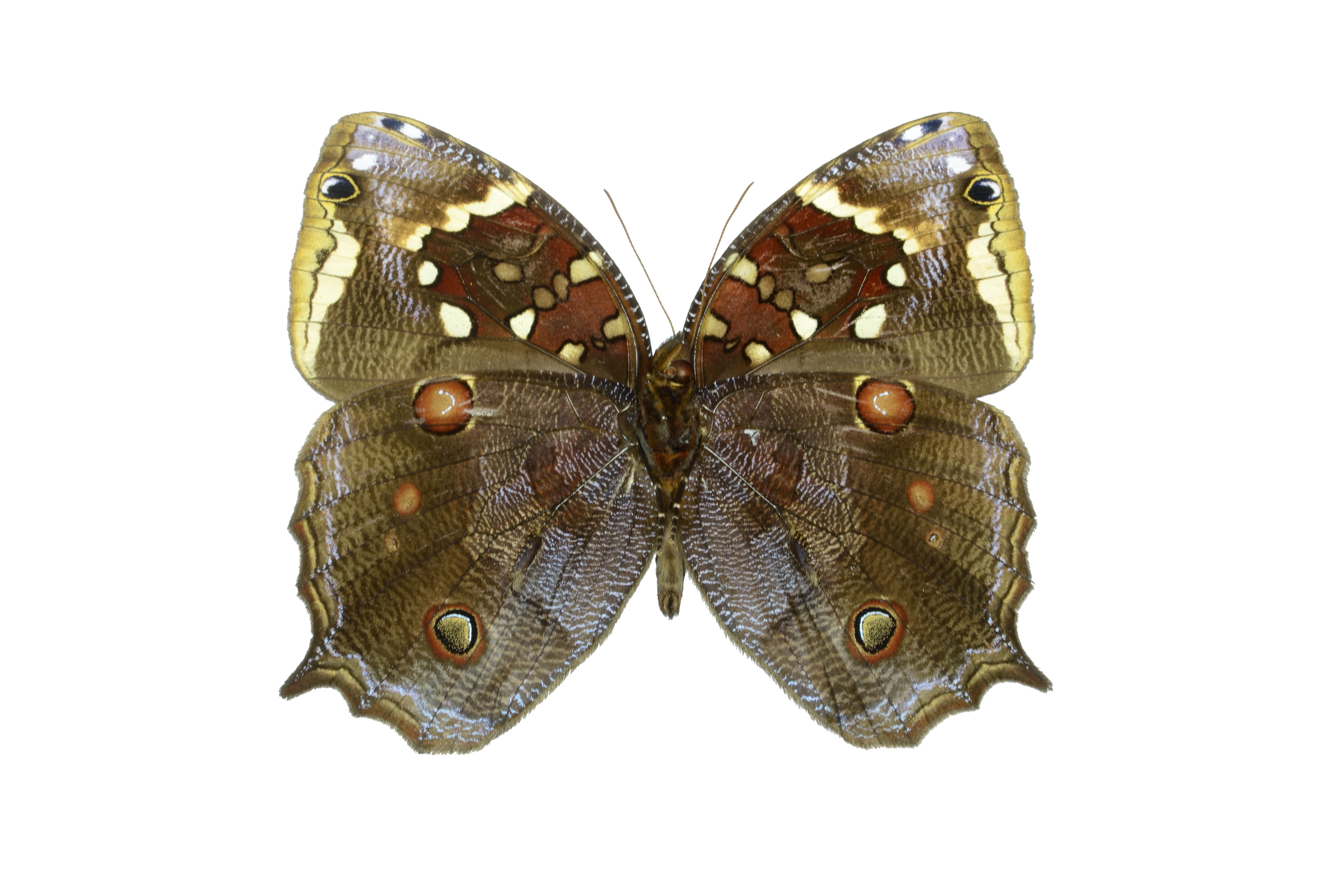
- verso

Scientific classification
- Kingdom: Animalia
- Phylum: Arthropoda
- Class: Insecta
- Order: Lepidoptera
- Family: Nymphalidae
- Genus: Opoptera
- Species: O. aorsa

Binomial name
- Opoptera aorsa (Godart, [1824])

= Opoptera aorsa =

Species of butterfly

Opoptera aorsa is a Neotropical species of butterfly of the family Nymphalidae described by Jean-Baptiste Godart in 1824. It is endemic to Brazil.

== Description ==
Forewing in the male with pale ochre-yellow oblique band, beginning beyond the middle of the inner margin and, sometimes. slightly interrupted, running to the anal angle. In the apex small white spots. Hindwing with distinct marginal markings. Of the narrow bands crossing the cell of the forewing the proximal is as a rule dull whitish or brown, interrupted in the middle, the distal complete, of silver-white colour, reaching to the middle part of the median. It is characterised by very narrow bands and by a purple gloss which covers these bands in their marginal part.

== Biology ==
The larva feeds on Bambusa vulgaris. It is a species of the larger forests, never leaving the shade of their tall trees.
