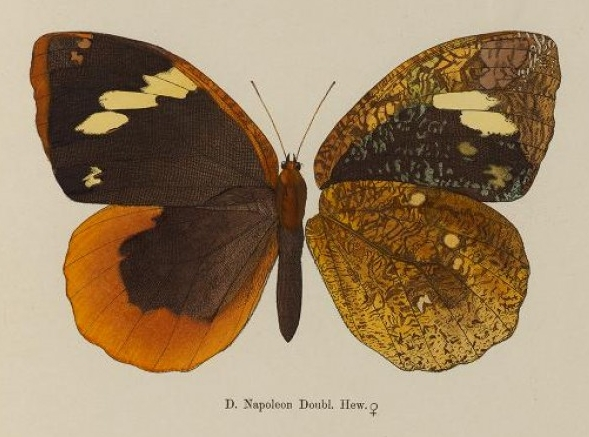

Scientific classification
- Kingdom: Animalia
- Phylum: Arthropoda
- Class: Insecta
- Order: Lepidoptera
- Family: Nymphalidae
- Genus: Dynastor
- Species: D. napoleon

Binomial name
- Dynastor napoleon Doubleday, 1849

Synonyms
- Dynastor f. maculatus Niepelt, 1922

= Dynastor napoleon =

Species of butterfly

Dynastor napoleon is a species of nymphalid butterfly native to Brazil.

Its wingspan is about 125 mm. Dynastor napoleon is a large butterfly with a wingspan of with a humped costal margin on the forewings. The upperside of the wings is brown, with the forewings adorned with a white band extending from the midpoint of the costal margin to the outer corner, and a thin orange border along the costal margin and halfway up the outer margin from the apex. The hindwings are brown with a very broad orange-yellow border. The underside is golden beige, with the forewings a large part of the wing from the inner edge being dark brown to black.

The larvae feed on the bromeliads Aechmea nudicaulis and pineapple (Ananas comosus).The imago is crepuscular.
