= Caligopsis =

Scientific classification
- Kingdom: Animalia
- Phylum: Arthropoda
- Clade: Pancrustacea
- Class: Insecta
- Order: Lepidoptera
- Family: Nymphalidae
- Tribe: Brassolini
- Genus: Caligopsis; Seydel, 1924

Genus of brush-footed butterflies

Caligopsis is a genus of owl butterfly in the family Nymphalidae.

== Species ==
- Caligopsis seleucida (Hewitson, 1877)
