= Orobrassolis =

Scientific classification
- Kingdom: Animalia
- Phylum: Arthropoda
- Class: Insecta
- Order: Lepidoptera
- Family: Nymphalidae
- Subfamily: Satyrinae
- Tribe: Brassolini
- Genus: Orobrassolis; Casagrande, 1982

Genus of brush-footed butterflies

Orobrassolis is a genus of Neotropical butterflies in the family Nymphalidae.

Orobrassolis are medium-sized butterflies with forewing length of about 35–39 mm (1.4–1.5 in).

== Species ==
The genus contains the following species, both only known from Brazil:

- Orobrassolis ornamentalis (Stichel, 1906) – Minas Gerais, São Paulo
- Orobrassolis latusoris Penz & Simonsen, 2011 – Paraná

Orobrassolis latusoris, described based on two males collected in the early 1900's, is probably extinct.
