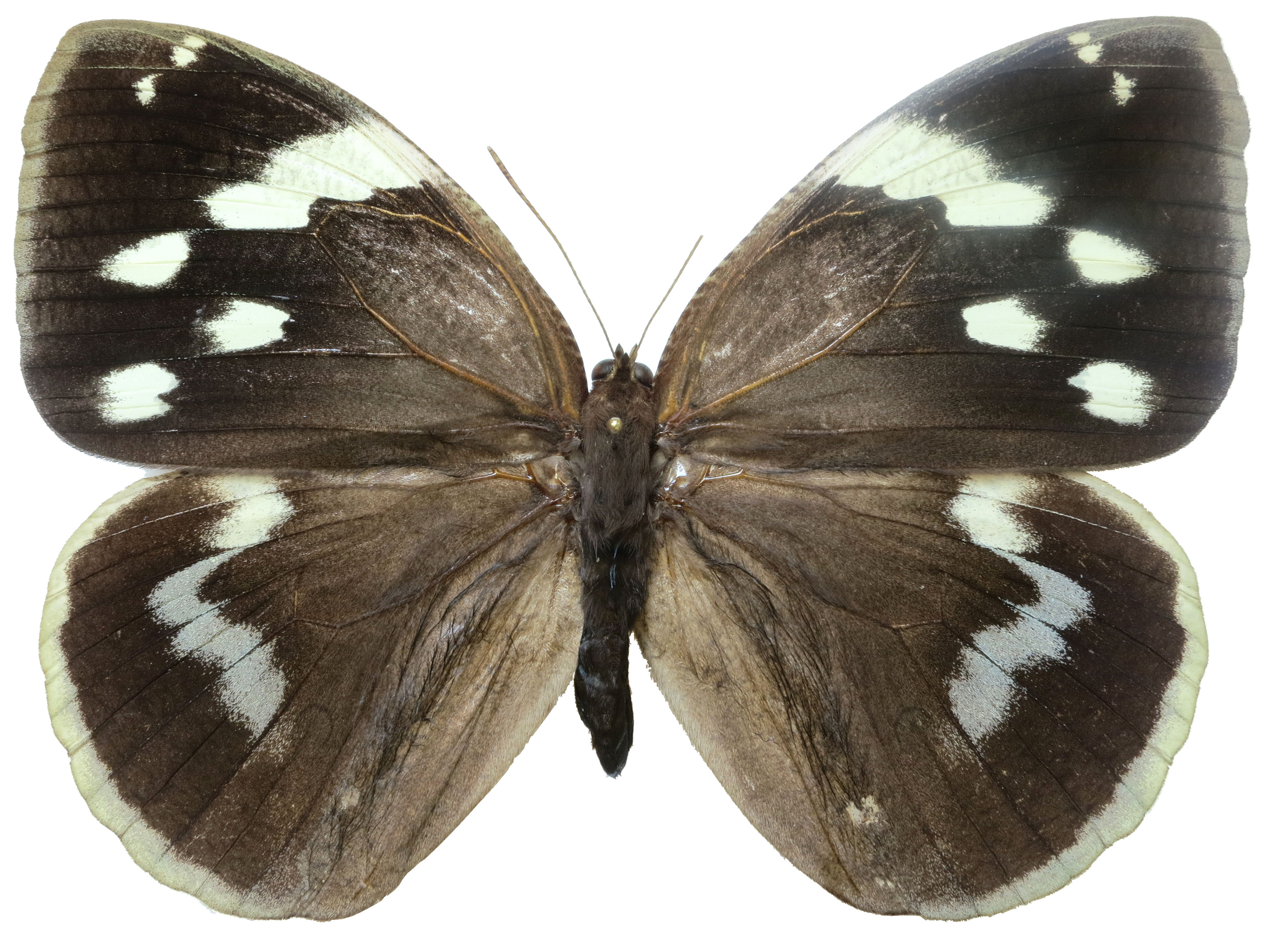
- D. d. darius subspecies

Scientific classification
- Kingdom: Animalia
- Phylum: Arthropoda
- Clade: Pancrustacea
- Class: Insecta
- Order: Lepidoptera
- Family: Nymphalidae
- Genus: Dynastor
- Species: D. darius

Binomial name
- Dynastor darius Fabricius, 1775

= Dynastor darius =

Species of butterfly

Dynastor darius, also known as the daring-owl butterfly, is a species of butterfly in the family Nymphalidae. The daring-owl butterfly is best known for its chrysalis's resemblance to a viper as a form of Batesian mimicry. It is native to Central and South America.

Dynastor darius is a large butterfly, with the costal edge of the forewings very curved. The upper side of the wings is dark black to brown in colour, with the forewings spotted with white in a short band from the middle of the costal edge and in isolated spots in the postdiscal area. The underside is beige with, on the forewing, a large whitish area along the costal edge from its middle to the apex.

== Subspecies ==
There a currently seven recognized subspecies.

- Dynastor darius anaxarete Cramer, 1776
- Dynastor darius darius Fabricius, 1775
- Dynastor darius faenius Fruhstorfer, 1912
- Dynastor darius icterica Stichel, 1904
- Dynastor darius mardonius Fruhstorfer, 1911
- Dynastor darius populus Röber, 1927
- Dynastor darius stygianus Butler, 1872

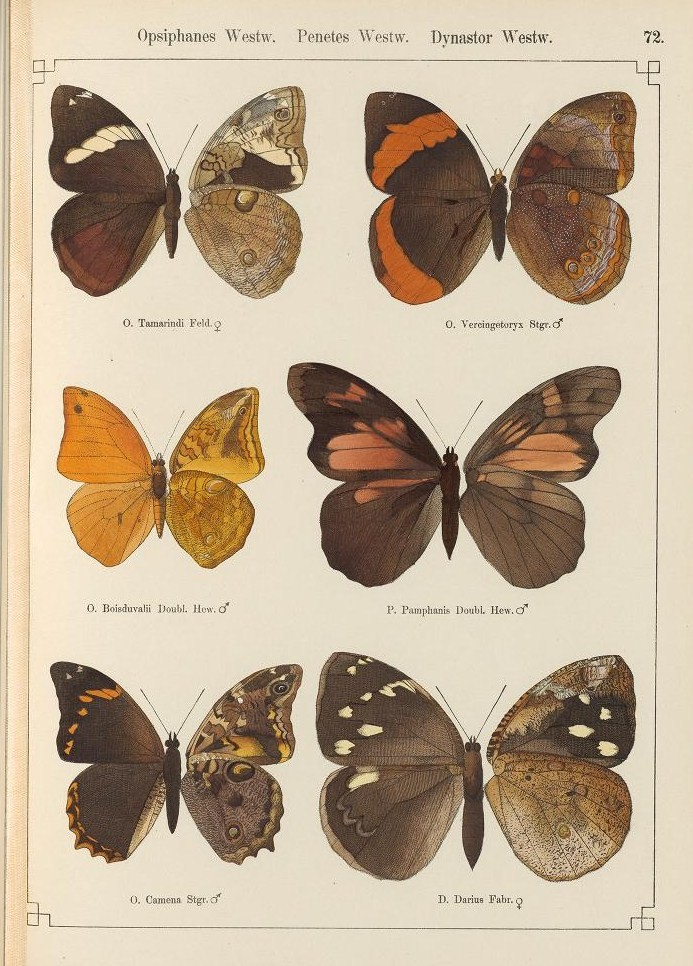
