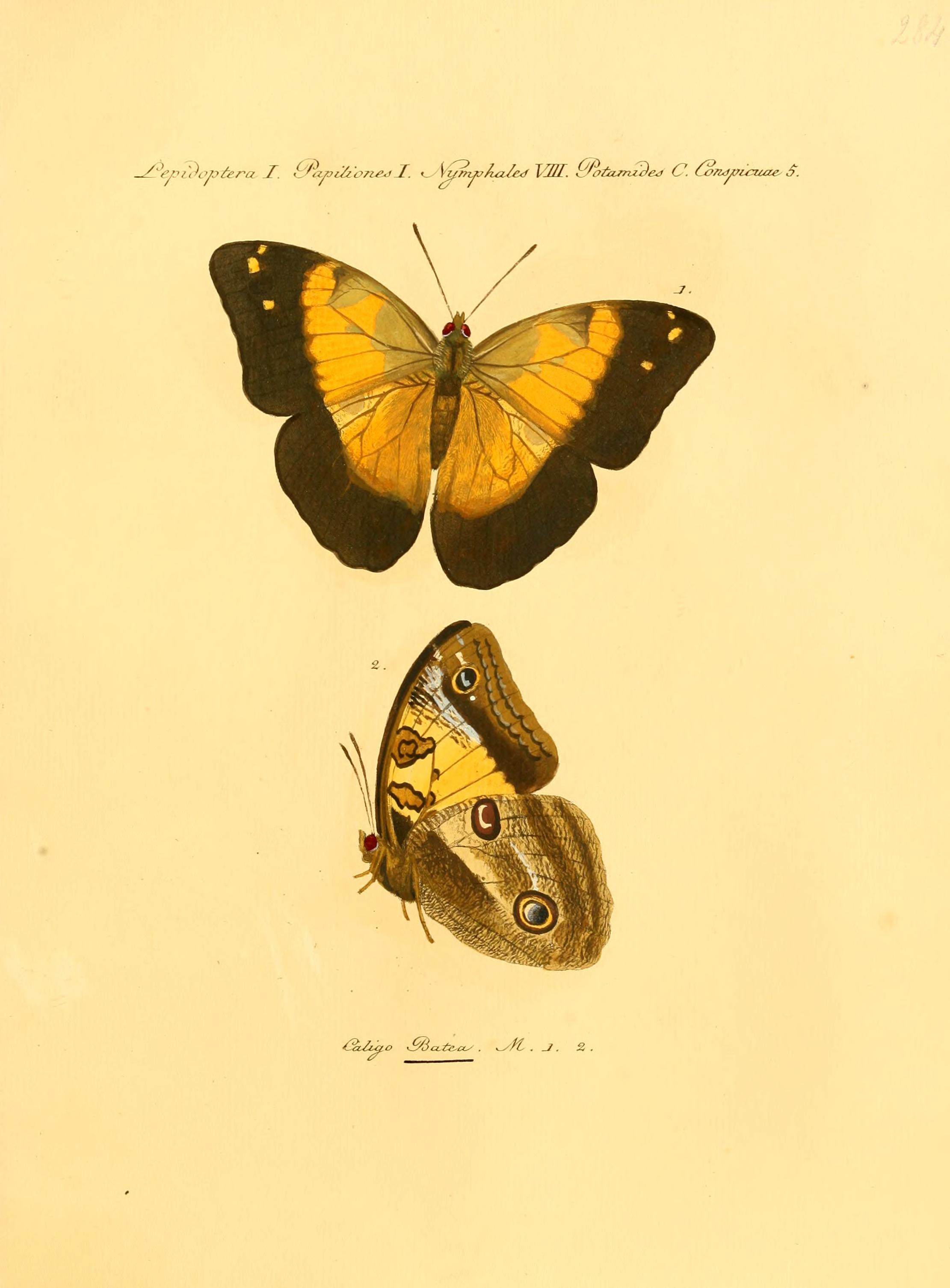
- Blepolenis batea

Scientific classification
- Kingdom: Animalia
- Phylum: Arthropoda
- Class: Insecta
- Order: Lepidoptera
- Family: Nymphalidae
- Tribe: Brassolini
- Genus: Blepolenis; Julius Röber, 1906

= Blepolenis =

Genus of brush-footed butterflies

Blepolenis is a Neotropical genus of butterflies in the family Nymphalidae and subfamily Morphinae.

They are large, brown butterflies with broad, rounded wings. The upperside is dark brown with a large, brownish-orange field at the base of each wing. The hindwing is grayish-brown, finely patterned (horizontally) with two large eyespots on each hindwing. The underside of the forewing has a broad, light field in the middle.

== Species ==
- Blepolenis bassus (C. & R. Felder, [1867])
- Blepolenis batea (Hübner, [1821])
- Blepolenis catharinae (Stichel, 1902)
