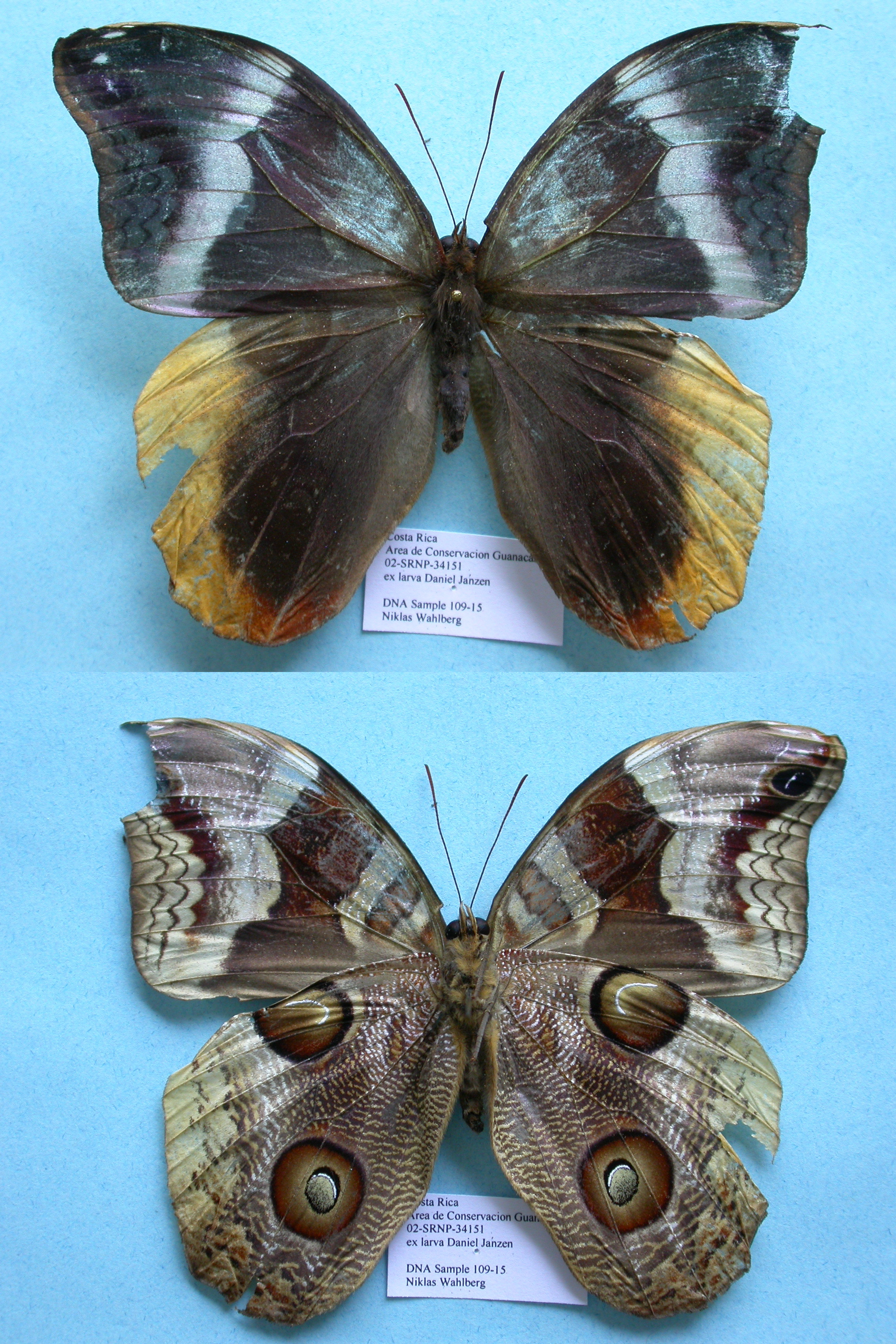
- Area de Conservacion Guanacaste, Costa Rica

Scientific classification
- Kingdom: Animalia
- Phylum: Arthropoda
- Clade: Pancrustacea
- Class: Insecta
- Order: Lepidoptera
- Family: Nymphalidae
- Genus: Catoblepia
- Species: C. orgetorix

Binomial name
- Catoblepia orgetorix (Hewitson, 1870)

Subspecies
- Catoblepia orgetorix flemmingi (Rothschild, 1916); Catoblepia orgetorix magnalis (Stichel, 1901); Catoblepia orgetorix sticheli (Rothschild, 1932)

= Catoblepia orgetorix =

Species of butterfly

Catoblepia orgetorix is a species of butterfly of the family Nymphalidae. It is found in Central America and parts of South America with a range extending from Honduras to Ecuador and Colombia. It was first identified in 1870 by British naturalist William Hewitson.

== Subspecies ==
Catoblepia orgetorix has three accepted subspecies:

- Catoblepia orgetorix flemmingi (Rothschild, 1916)
- Catoblepia orgetorix magnalis (Stichel, 1901)
- Catoblepia orgetorix sticheli (Rothschild, 1932)
