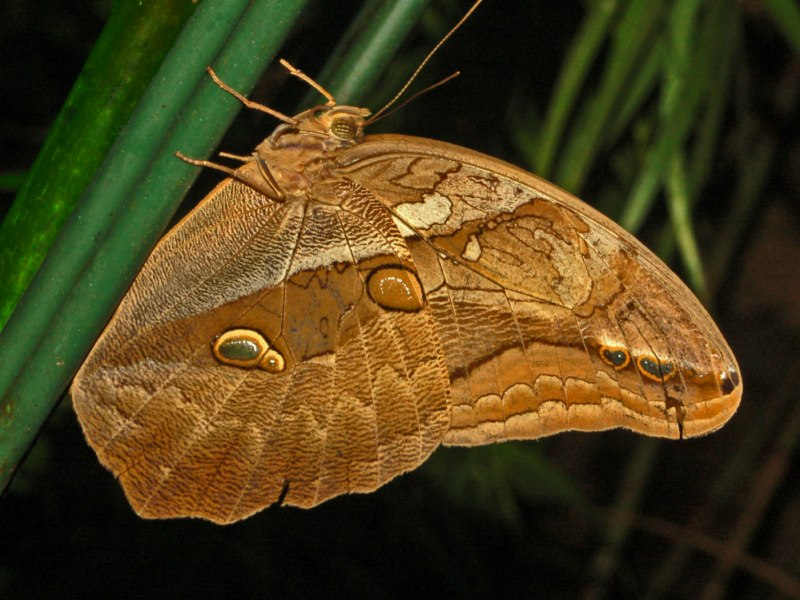

Scientific classification
- Domain: Eukaryota
- Kingdom: Animalia
- Phylum: Arthropoda
- Class: Insecta
- Order: Lepidoptera
- Family: Nymphalidae
- Genus: Eryphanis
- Species: E. automedon

Binomial name
- Eryphanis automedon (Cramer, 1775)

Synonyms
- Papilio automedon Cramer, [1775]; Eryphanis polyxena (Meerburgh, 1780); Papilio polyxena Meerburgh, 1780; Moera automedaena Hübner, [1819]; Eryphanis wardii Boisduval, 1870

= Eryphanis automedon =

Species of butterfly

Eryphanis automedon, the Automedon giant owl, is a species of butterfly belonging to the family Nymphalidae.

== Description ==
Eryphanis automedon has a wingspan reaching about 55–60 millimetres (2.2–2.4 in). In males the dorsal sides of the wings show night blue iridescent patches, extending from submedial to postmedial areas, with well defined borders separating the non-iridescent sections. Ventral sides vary from faded brown to caramel color, with various eyespots. The female wingspan is slightly larger, with a slightly different wing color pattern.

This butterfly can live up to six weeks and flies in the dark forests of Latin America. It is a fast flying butterfly. The caterpillars are cryptically colored and feed at night on Poaceae host plants (mainly bamboo leaves), of which the elongated chrysalis mimics the appearance of a dried leaf.

== Distribution ==
This butterfly is native to South America. It is present from Venezuela to the Guianas and Brazil and from Colombia to Paraguay, at an elevation of 0–1,000 metres (0–3,281 ft) above sea level.

== Subspecies ==
The following subspecies are recognized:

- Eryphanis automedon automedon (Suriname)
- Eryphanis automedon lycomedon (C. & R. Felder, 1862) (Guatemala and Costa Rica to Colombia)
- Eryphanis automedon amphimedon (C. & R. Felder, 1867) (Brazil)
- Eryphanis automedon tristis Staudinger, 1887 (Peru)
- Eryphanis automedon novicia Stichel, 1904 (Ecuador)
- Eryphanis automedon cheiremon Fruhstorfer, 1912 (Bolivia)
- Eryphanis automedon spintharus Fruhstorfer, 1912 (Colombia)
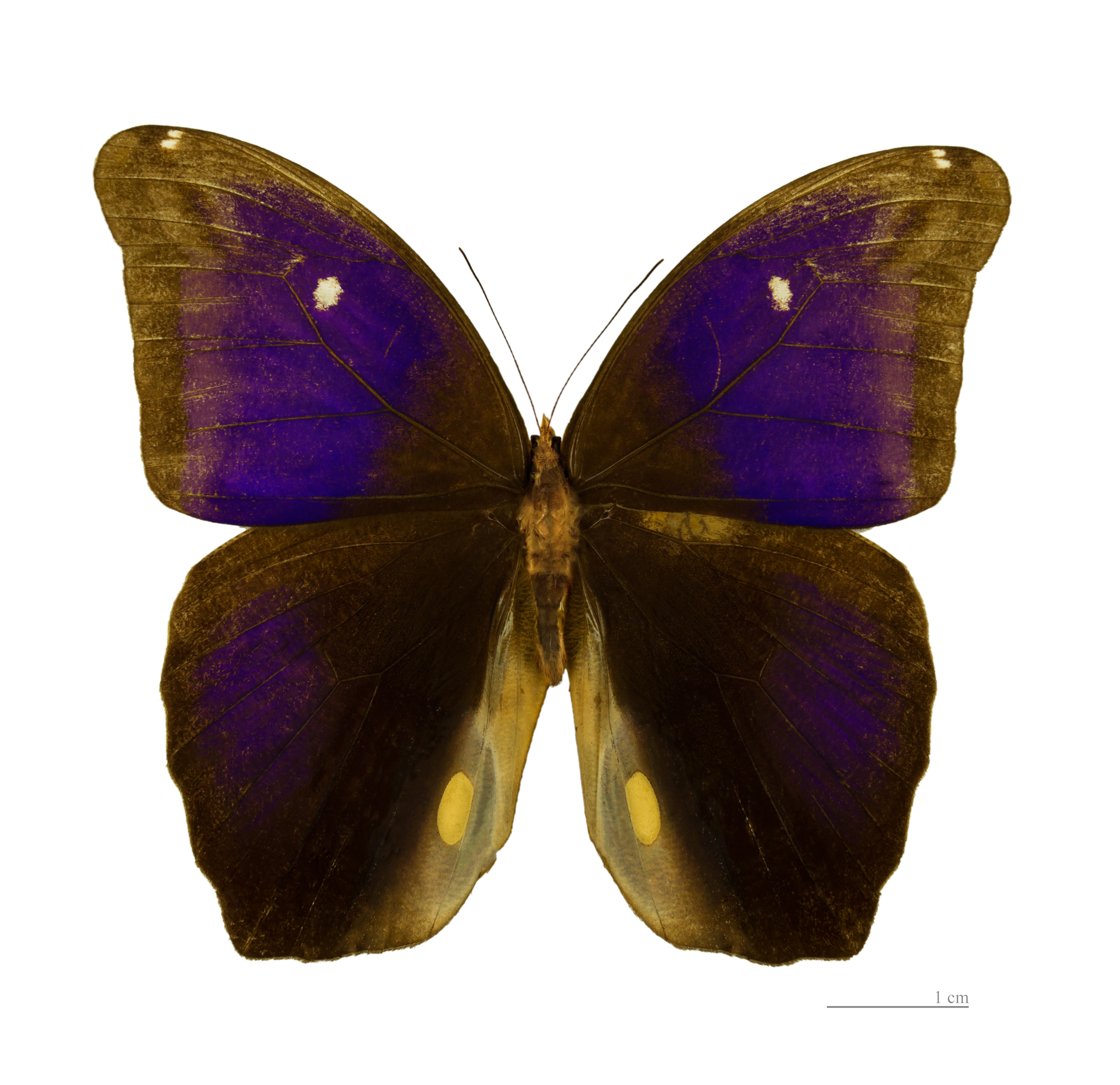
Eryphanis automedon automedon, male dorsal side - MHNT

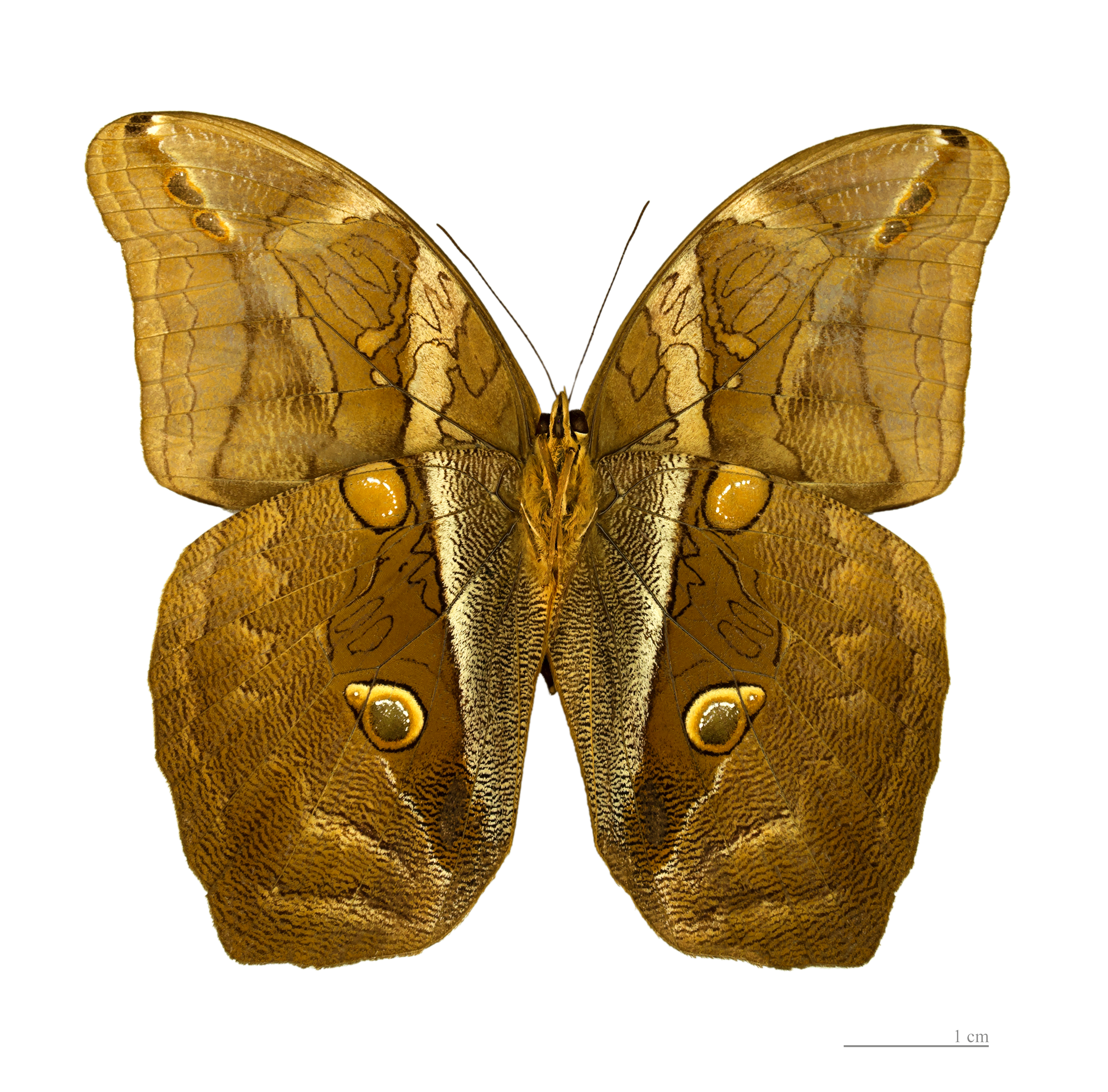
Eryphanis automedon automedon, male ventral side - MHNT

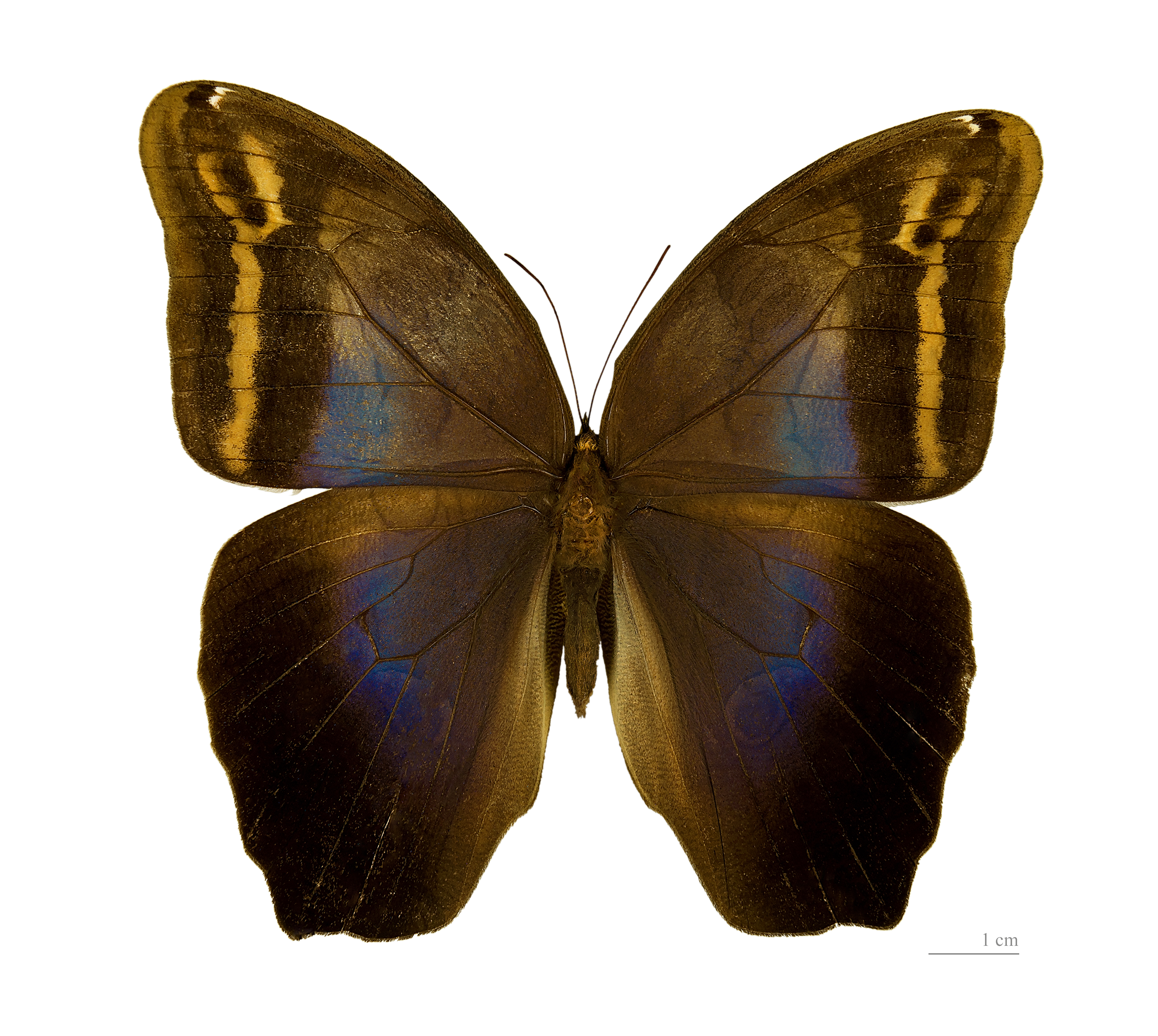
Eryphanis automedon automedon, female dorsal side - MHNT

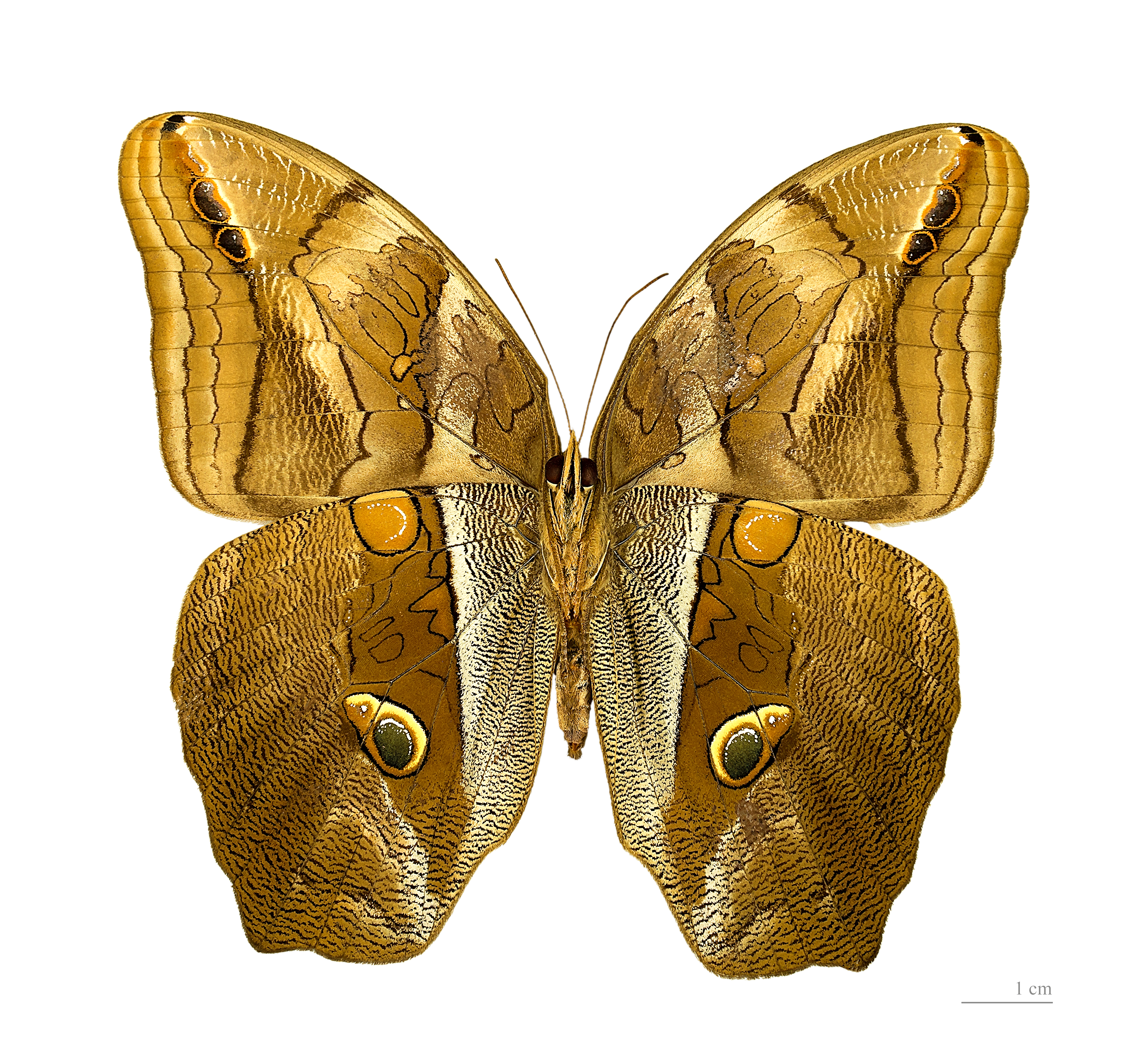
Eryphanis automedon automedon, female ventral side - MHNT
