= Selenophanes josephus =

- As excultus Stichel

Scientific classification
- Kingdom: Animalia
- Phylum: Arthropoda
- Clade: Pancrustacea
- Class: Insecta
- Order: Lepidoptera
- Family: Nymphalidae
- Genus: Selenophanes
- Species: S. josephus

Binomial name
- Selenophanes josephus (Godman and Salvin,1881

Species of butterfly

Selenophanes josephus is a Neotropical species of butterfly of the family Nymphalidae described by Frederick DuCane Godman and Osbert Salvin in 1881. It is found in Panama, Guatemala, Ecuador and Colombia.

== Description ==
Selenophanes josephus is a butterfly with a concave outer edge on its forewings. The upperside of the wings is brown with, on the forewings, a scalloped yellow band extending from the outer third of the costal margin to the inner angle. The hindwings are brown with a dark mark near the cell at the base of e6.The underside is pearly beige marbled with gold with ocelli, a small brown at the apex of the forewings and on the hindwings a large yellow near the costal margin and one close to the anal angle.
