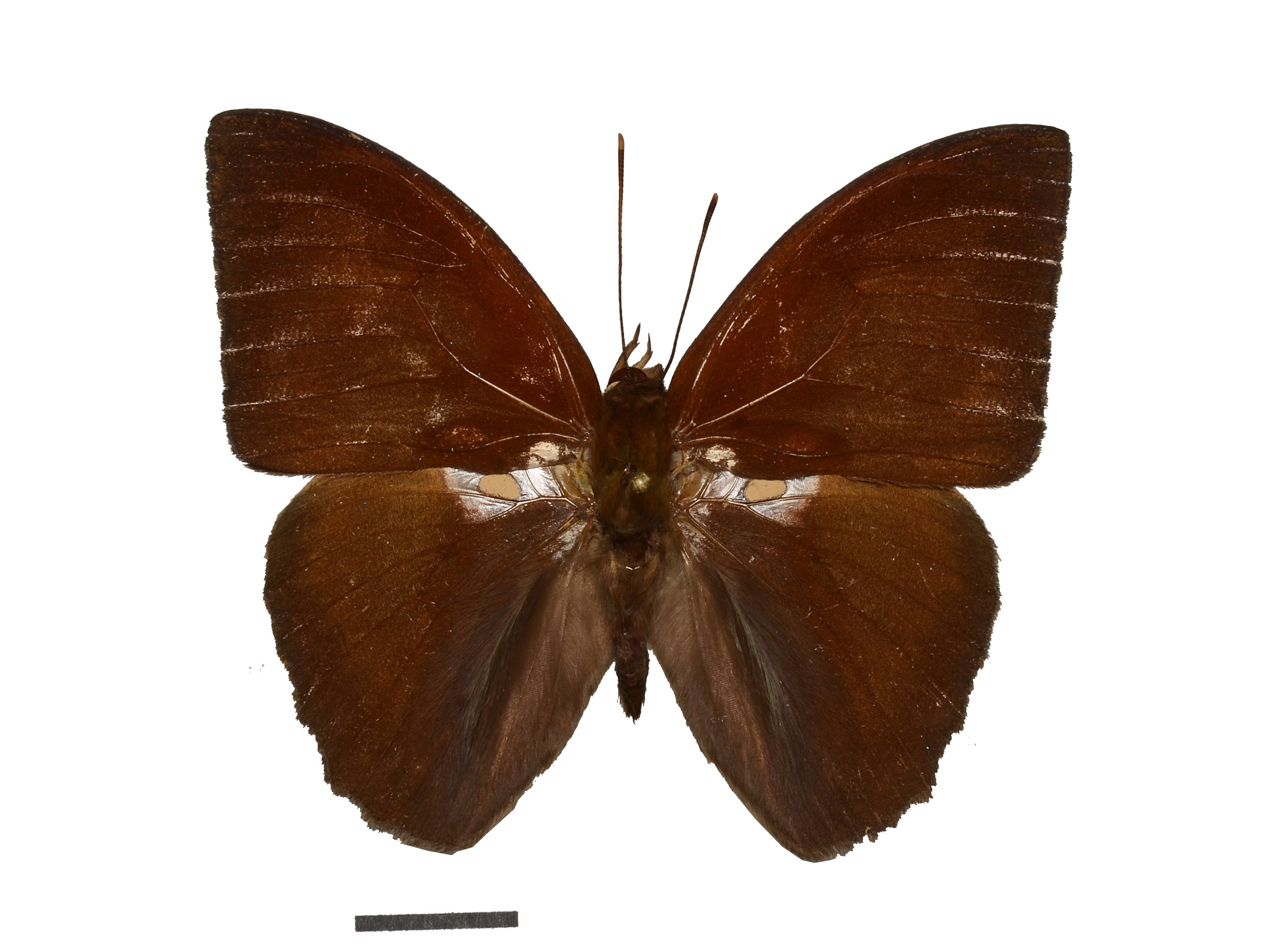
- Narope obidos

Scientific classification
- Kingdom: Animalia
- Phylum: Arthropoda
- Class: Insecta
- Order: Lepidoptera
- Family: Nymphalidae
- Tribe: Brassolini
- Genus: Narope; Doubleday, [1849]

Type species
- Narope cyllastros Doubleday, [1849]

Diversity
- 17 species

= Narope =

Genus of brush-footed butterflies

Narope is a genus of Neotropical butterflies in the family Nymphalidae, and includes species that present inconspicuously marked patterns on mottled brown, beige, or cinnamon wings.The forewings are falcate.The submedian of the forewing is strongly sinuous in the male, this formation being closely associated with the presence of a tuft in the male (as a sexual character) on the under surface beneath this vein; with the hair-tuft corresponds a shiny spot at the costal margin on the upperside of the hindwing. The precostal cell is extraordinarily large and well developed; the precostal vein is simple, nearly straight and proximally directed. The cell is obliquely closed by a rather short and straight lower discocellular. The genus includes 16 species.

== Species ==
- Narope albopunctum (Stichel, 1904)
- Narope anartes (Hewitson, 1874)
- Narope cauca (Casagrande, 2002)
- Narope cyllabarus (Westwood, 1851)
- Narope cyllarus (Westwood, 1851)
- Narope cyllastros (Doubleday, 1849)
- Narope cyllene (C & R Felder, 1859)
- Narope dentimaculatus (Talbot, 1928)
- Narope guilhermei (Casagrande, 1989)
- Narope marmorata (Schaus, 1902)
- Narope minor (Casagrande, 2002)
- Narope nesope (Hewitson, 1869)
- Narope obidos (Casagrande, 2002)
- Narope panniculus (Stichel, 1904)
- Narope syllabus (Staudinger, 1887)
- Narope testacea (Godman & Salvin, 1878)
- Narope ybyra (Casagrande, 2002)
