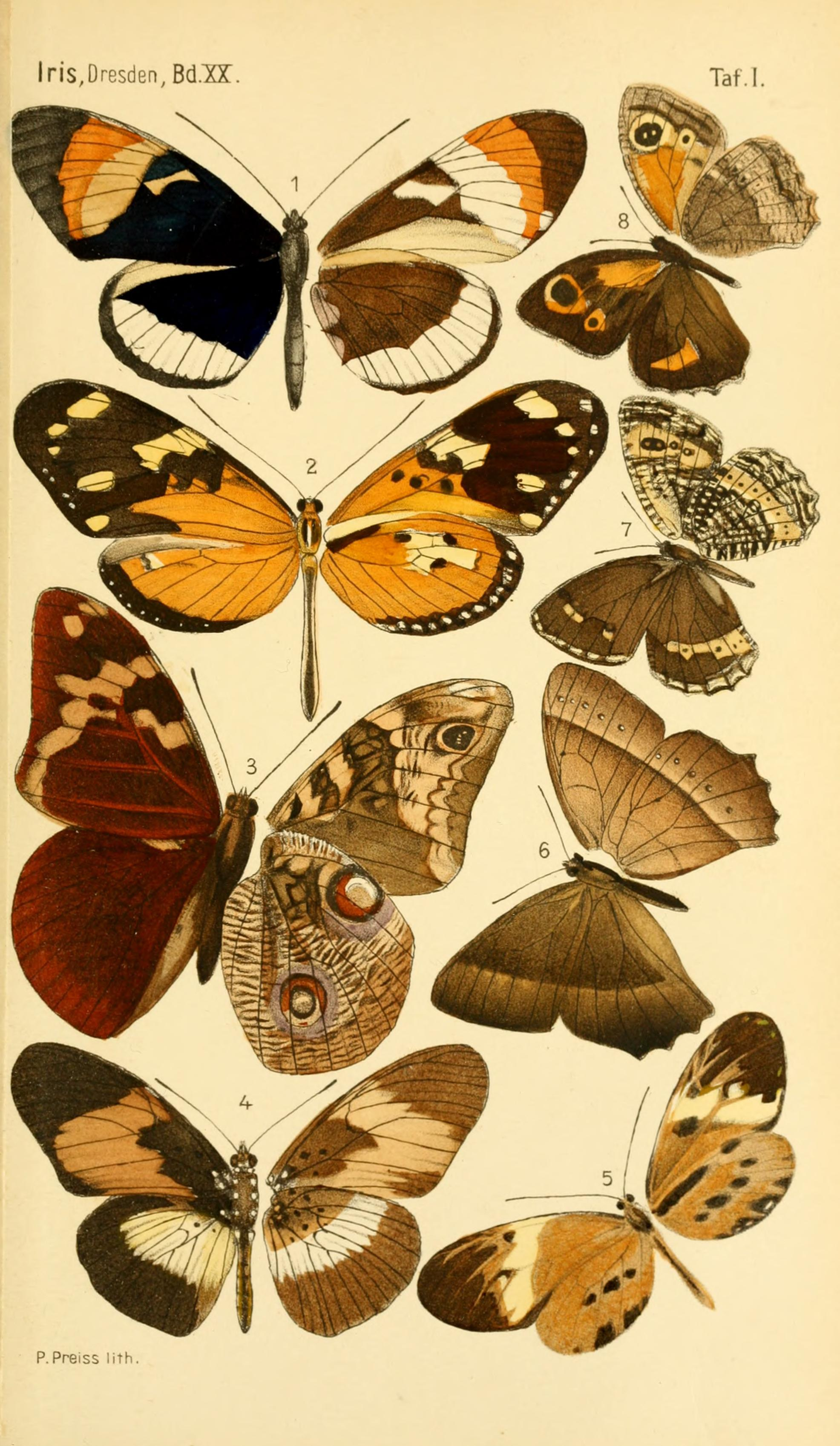
- Mielkella singularis, figure 3

Scientific classification
- Domain: Eukaryota
- Kingdom: Animalia
- Phylum: Arthropoda
- Class: Insecta
- Order: Lepidoptera
- Family: Nymphalidae
- Tribe: Brassolini
- Genus: Mielkella; Casagrande 1982
- Species: M. singularis

Binomial name
- Mielkella singularis (Weymer 1907)

Synonyms
- Opsiphanes singularis Weymer, 1907

= Mielkella =

Monotypic brush-footed butterfly genus

Mielkella is a Neotropical butterfly genus in the family Nymphalidae. The genus is monotypic containing the single species Mielkella singularis from Guatemala and Mexico.
