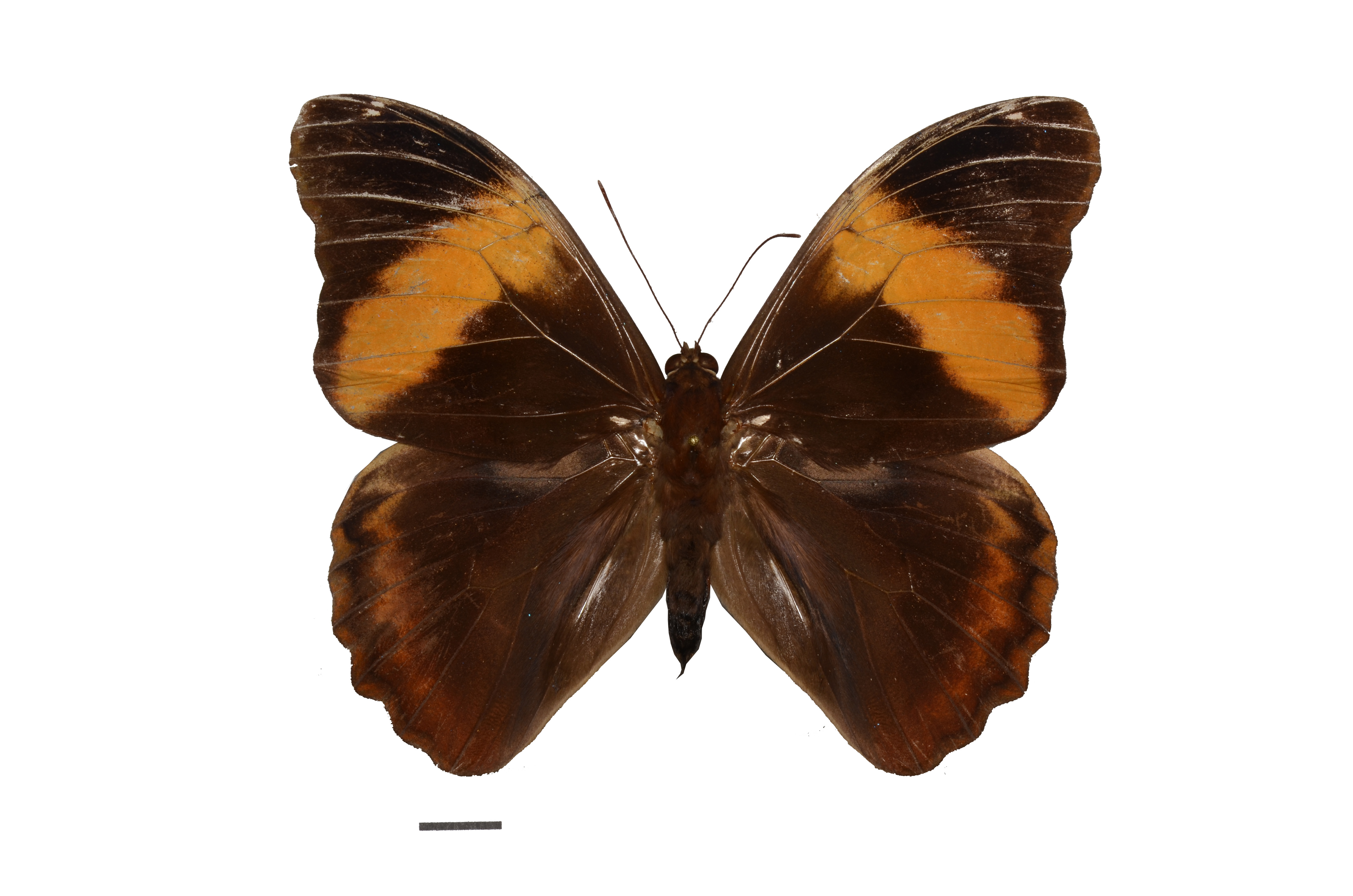
- Dorsal view
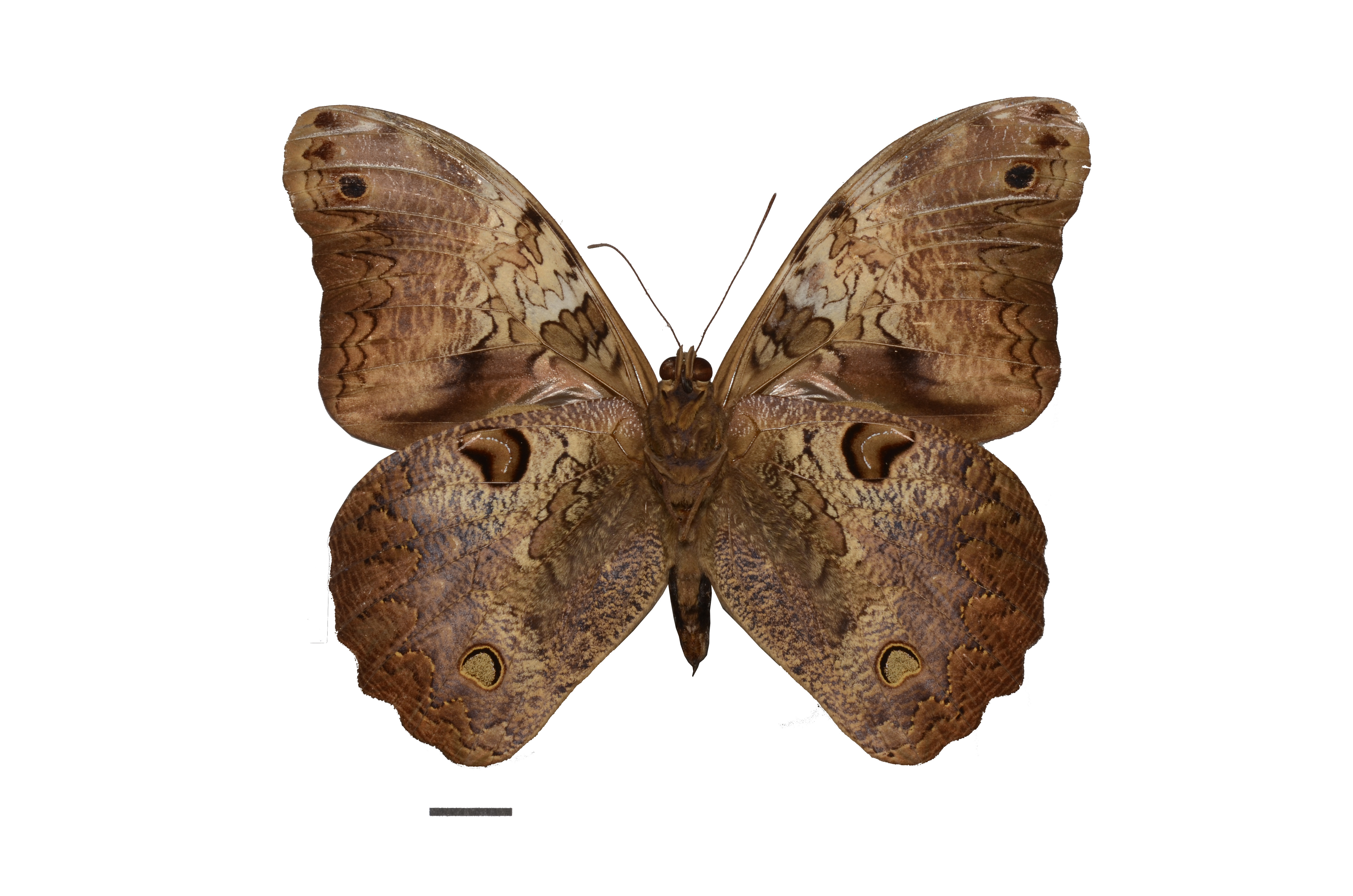
- Ventral view

Scientific classification
- Kingdom: Animalia
- Phylum: Arthropoda
- Class: Insecta
- Order: Lepidoptera
- Family: Nymphalidae
- Genus: Selenophanes
- Species: S. cassiope

Binomial name
- Selenophanes cassiope (Cramer, 1775)

Synonyms
- Papilio cassiope Cramer, [1775]; Morpho caryatis Godart, [1824]; Opsiphanes cassiope var. cassiopeia Staudinger, [1886]; Opsiphanes cassiope placentia Fruhstorfer, 1912

= Selenophanes cassiope =

Species of butterfly

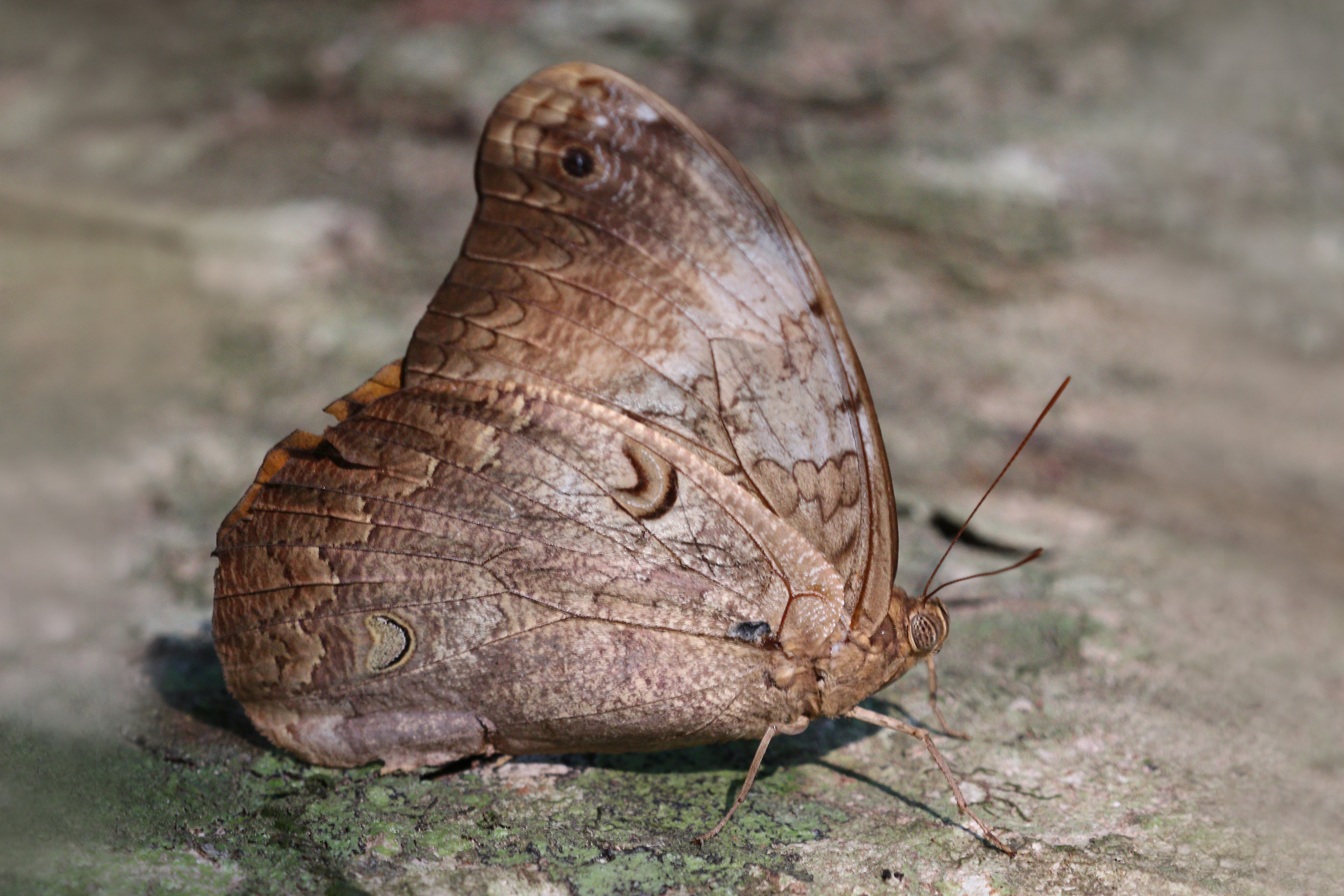
Near the Cristalino River, Southern Amazon, Brazil

Selenophanes cassiope, the cassiope owlet, is a butterfly of the family Nymphalidae. It was described by Pieter Cramer in 1775. It is found from Colombia through the Guianas to south-eastern Brazil.

== Subspecies ==
- Selenophanes cassiope cassiope (Surinam, Guyana)
- Selenophanes cassiope amplior Stichel, 1902 (Colombia)
- Selenophanes cassiope andromeda Stichel, 1901 (Bolivia)
- Selenophanes cassiope cassiopeia (Staudinger, [1886]) (Peru, Brazil: Amazonas)
- Selenophanes cassiope guarany Casagrande, 1992 (Brazil: São Paulo)
- Selenophanes cassiope haraposa Bristow, 1982 (Brazil: Pará)
- Selenophanes cassiope mapiriensis Bristow, 1982 (Bolivia)
- Selenophanes cassiope perenensis Bristow, 1982 (Peru)
- Selenophanes cassiope placentia (Fruhstorfer, 1912) (Bolivia)
- Selenophanes cassiope theognis Fruhstorfer, 1910 (Brazil: Mato Grosso)
