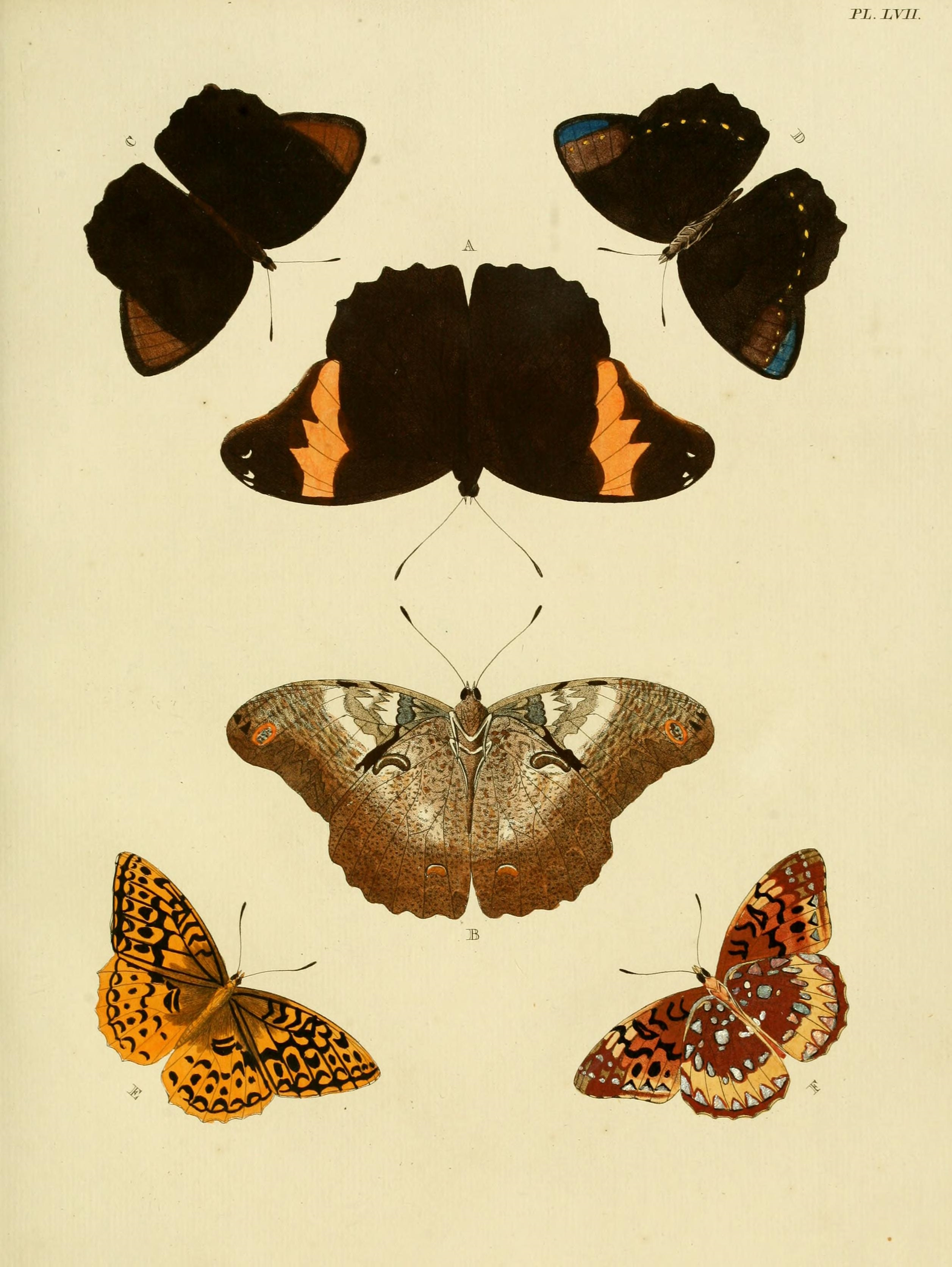

Scientific classification
- Domain: Eukaryota
- Kingdom: Animalia
- Phylum: Arthropoda
- Class: Insecta
- Order: Lepidoptera
- Family: Nymphalidae
- Tribe: Brassolini
- Genus: Selenophanes; Staudinger, [1887]

= Selenophanes =

Genus of brush-footed butterflies

Selenophanes is a genus of Neotropical butterflies.

== Species ==
- Unknown species group
  - Selenophanes cassiope (Cramer, [1775])
  - Selenophanes supremus Stichel, 1901
- The josephus species group
  - Selenophanes josephus (Godman & Salvin, [1881])
