= Caligopsis seleucida =

Scientific classification
- Kingdom: Animalia
- Phylum: Arthropoda
- Clade: Pancrustacea
- Class: Insecta
- Order: Lepidoptera
- Family: Nymphalidae
- Genus: Caligopsis
- Species: C. seleucida

Binomial name
- Caligopsis seleucida (Hewitson, 1877)

Species of butterfly

Caligopsis seleucida is a Neotropical species of butterfly of the family Nymphalidae described by William Chapman Hewitson in 1916. It is found in Brazil and Bolivia.

== Description ==
Under surface remarkable for the strikingly large ocelli. Male above rust-brown, anteriorly in the median area somewhat lighter, distal area broadly dark brown, the margin itself narrowly dirty ochre-yellow. Near the distal margin with a narrow,undulate, ochre-yellow, slightly reddish transverse band, from which arises anteriorly, but indefinitely connected,a short, strongly curved and angled, somewhat duller coloured accessory band, which, however, like the main band, does not quite reach the costal margin. In the fork of the bands 2 black spots and at the end of the principal branch of the band 2 small white dots. Beneath the median area forms a broad band, brown, distally tinged with lighter and darker ochreous, bordered en each side by a whitish stripe and distally in addition bounded by a twice broken black-brown line. Succeeding this the distal area is in its anterior, triangular part brown striated with white, posteriorly and distally with two black, yellow-ringed eye-spots, placed one behind the other, before these another black spot and two blind eye-spots near the apex. The area distally to the cell copiously dark-striated, bounded by a dark undulate line edged with ochre-yellow or whitish. Distal area rust-brown, likewise with dark, whitish-bordered line near the wing-margin. Hindwing with pale brown hindmarginal area, a bare friction-patch with pencil-like hairing between submedian and hindmarginal vein and a large mealy scent-scale spot in the region of the hinder angle. Ground-colour otherwise dark brown, in the middle of the wing tinged with reddish, distal margin narrowly bordered with rust-brown. Under surface in the basal and distal areas brown, profusely striated with black or black-brown. Median area broadly band-like, dark brown with white bordering. The area behind the eye-spots more or less striated with whitish. In the anterior part of the median area is also placed a large dark brown eye-spot with yellowish ring and white pupil. In the distal marginal area there is an undulate line bordered with light brown.
