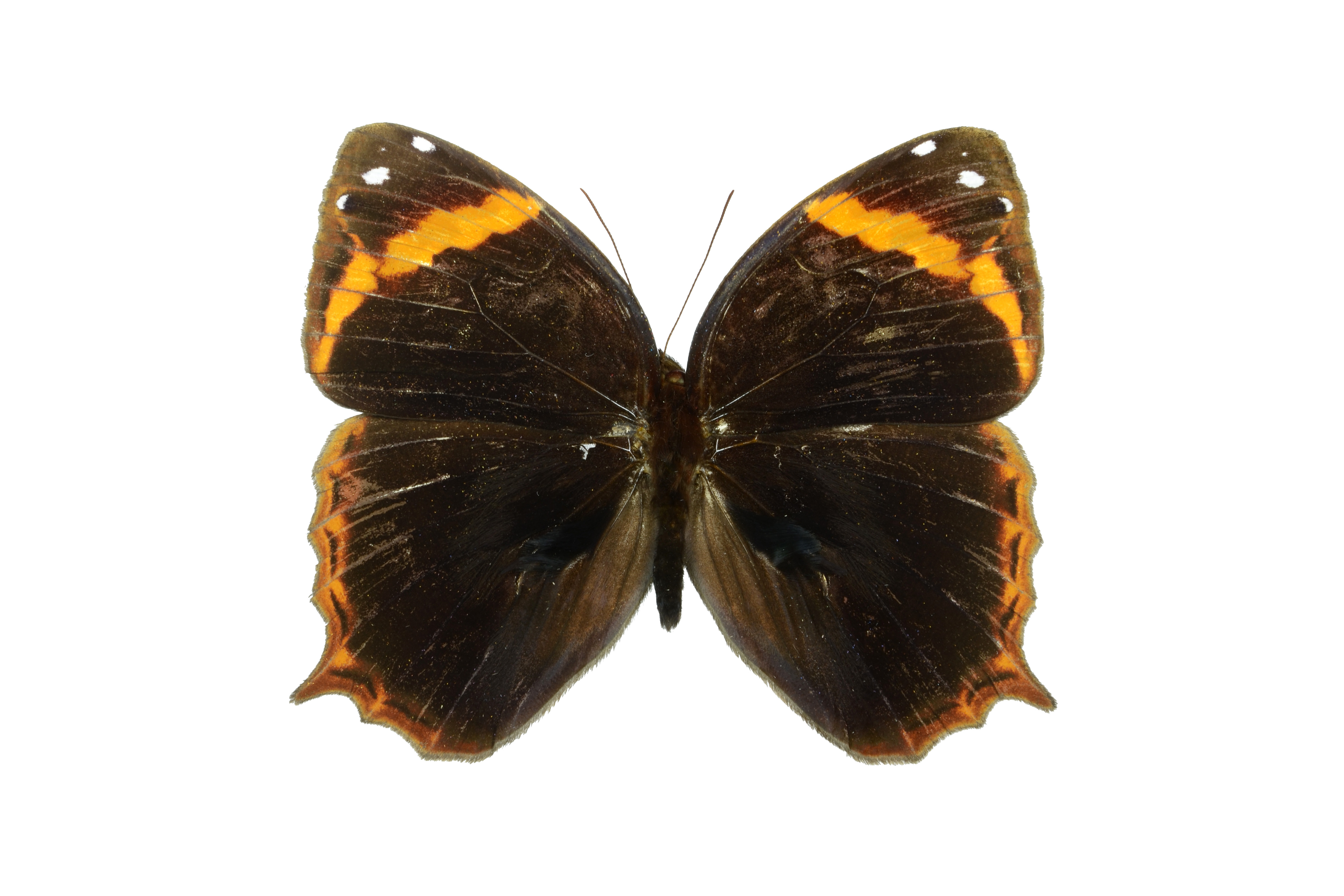

Scientific classification
- Domain: Eukaryota
- Kingdom: Animalia
- Phylum: Arthropoda
- Class: Insecta
- Order: Lepidoptera
- Family: Nymphalidae
- Tribe: Brassolini
- Genus: Opoptera; Aurivillius, 1882

Synonyms
- Mimoblepia Casagrande, 1982

= Opoptera =

Genus of brush-footed butterflies

Opoptera is a genus of South American butterflies formerly considered to be part of the genus Opsiphanes.

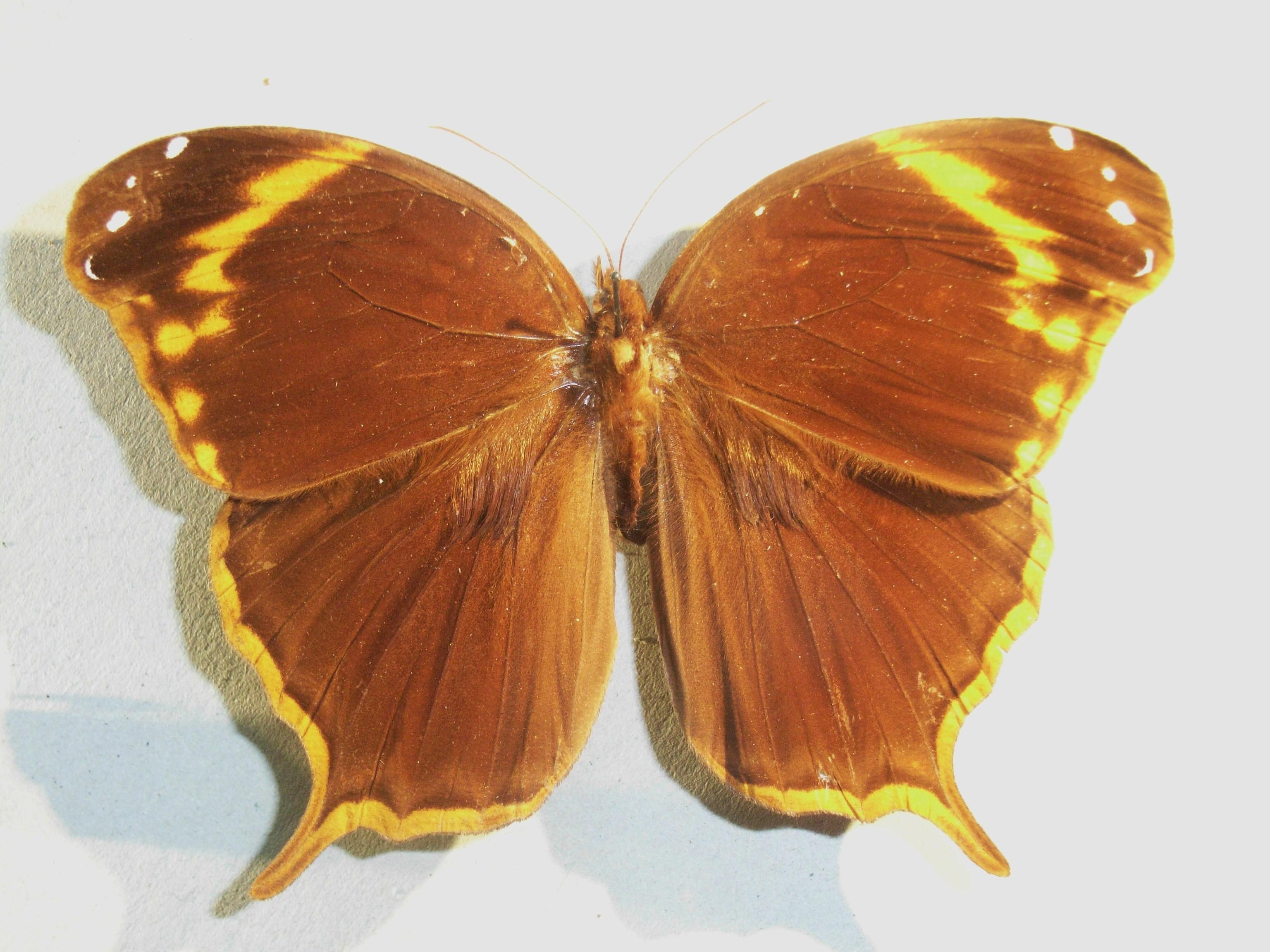

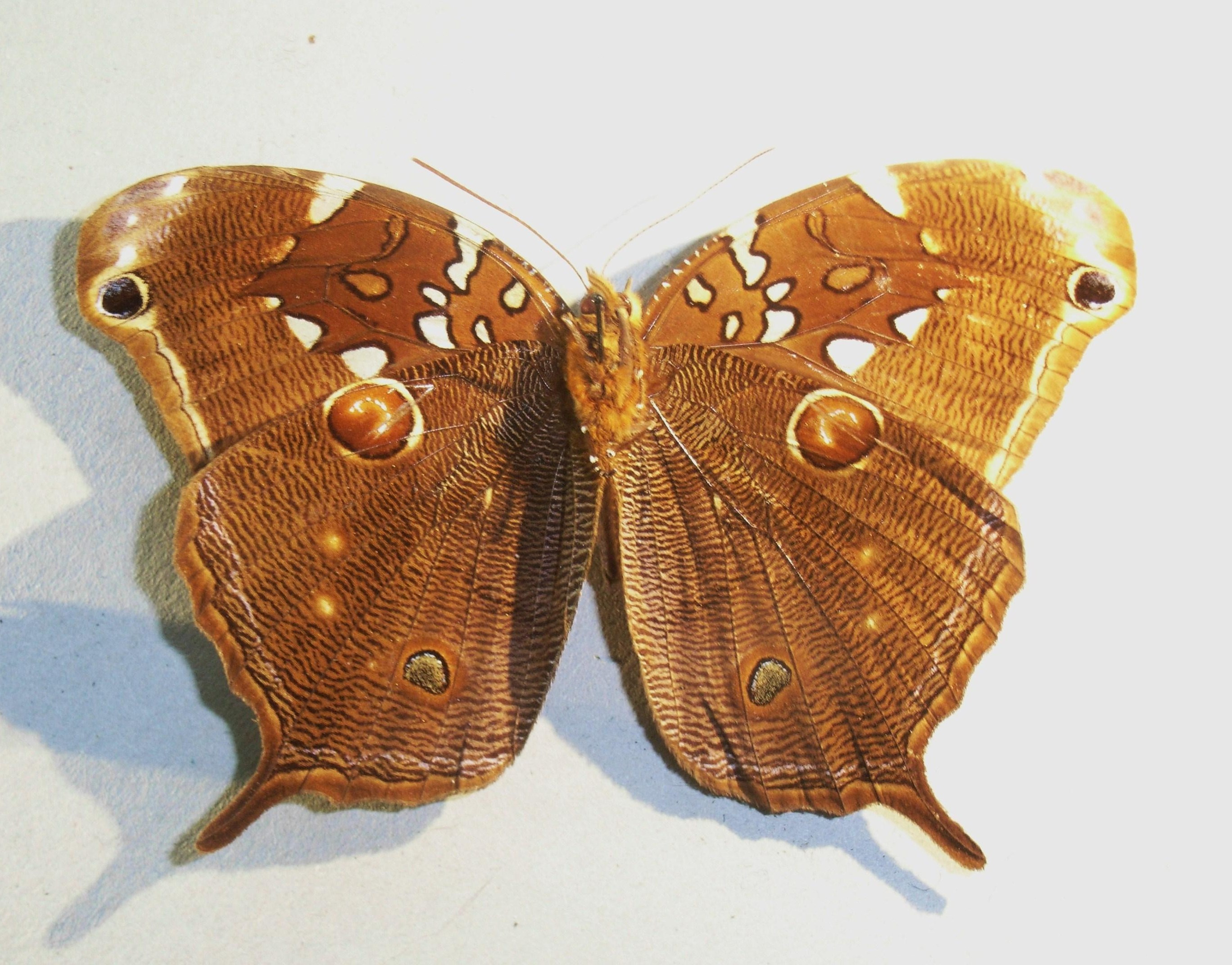

== Species ==
- Species group aorsa
  - Opoptera aorsa (Godart, [1824])
  - Opoptera arsippe (Hopffer, 1874)
  - Opoptera bracteolata Stichel, 1901
  - Opoptera hilaris Stichel, 1901
  - Opoptera staudingeri (Godman & Salvin, 1894)
- Species group syme
  - Opoptera fruhstorferi (Röber, 1896)
  - Opoptera sulcius (Staudinger, 1887)
  - Opoptera syme (Hübner, [1821])
