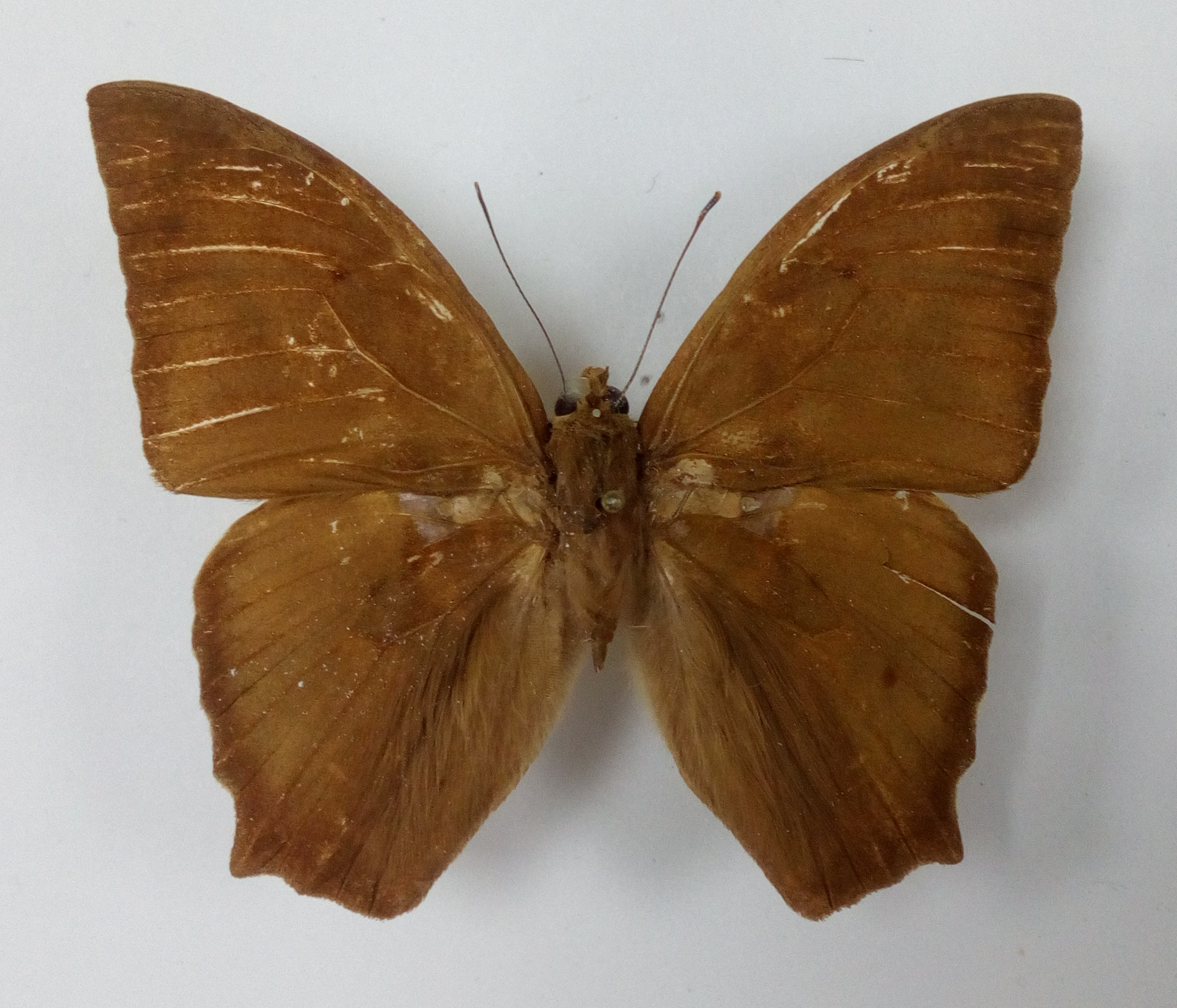

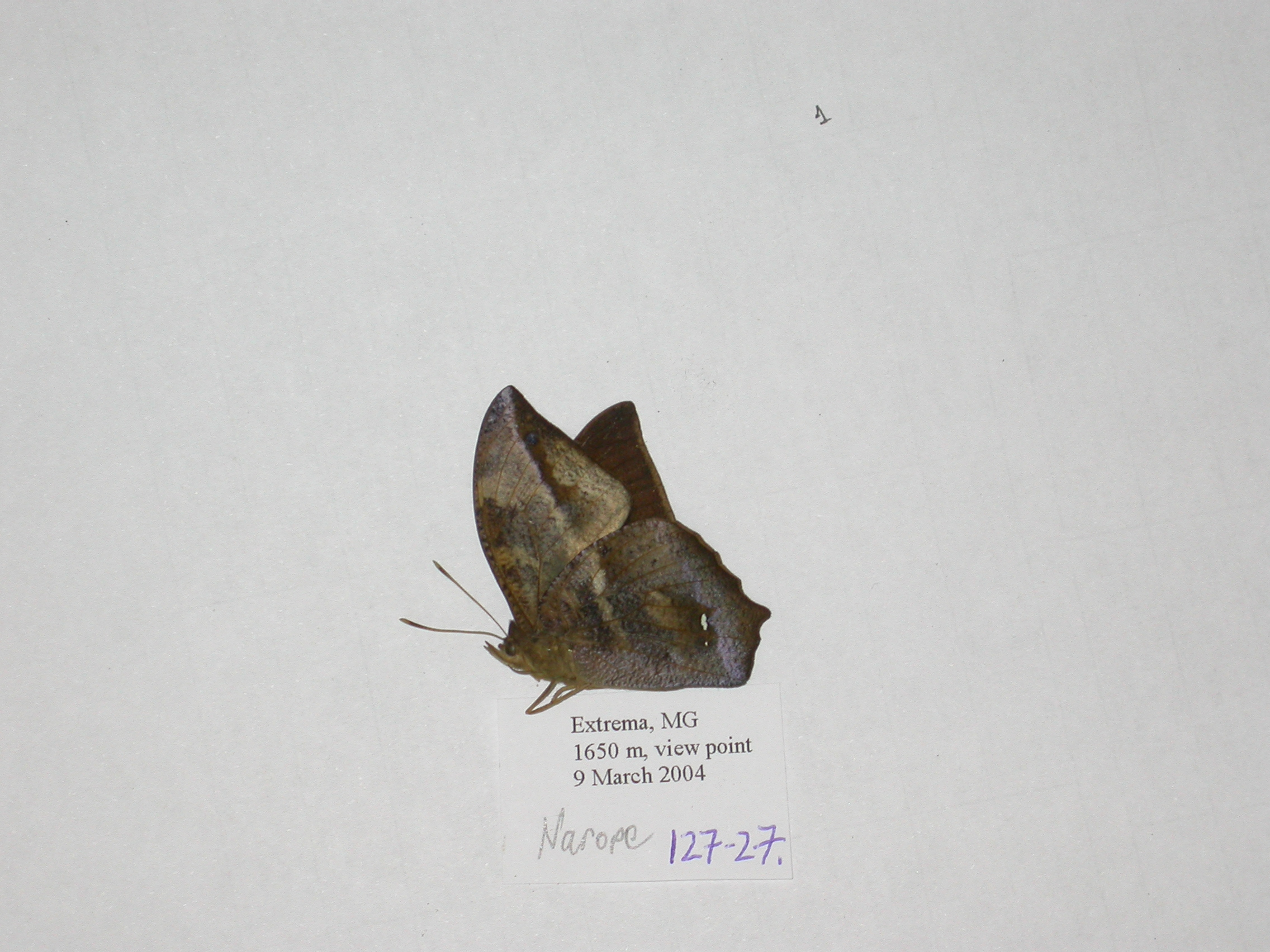

Scientific classification
- Kingdom: Animalia
- Phylum: Arthropoda
- Class: Insecta
- Order: Lepidoptera
- Family: Nymphalidae
- Genus: Narope
- Species: N. cyllastros

Binomial name
- Narope cyllastros (Doubleday, 1849) 1

= Narope cyllastros =

Species of butterfly

Narope cyllastros is a Neotropical species of butterfly of the family Nymphalidae. It is found in the upper Amazon and Mexico.

== Description ==
The male is rust-red above, apex of the forewing and basal half of the hindwing darkened with brownish. Distal margin of the hindwing only feebly angled at the middle median vein. The under surface is pale ochreous with scattered darker small spots, striae and shading, the whitish spots of the hindwing apparently always absent with the exception of the anterior ones. Female with the hindwing more strongly angled; upper surface of the wings dark brown or smoke-brown.

== Biology ==
The larvae feed on Bambusa spp.
