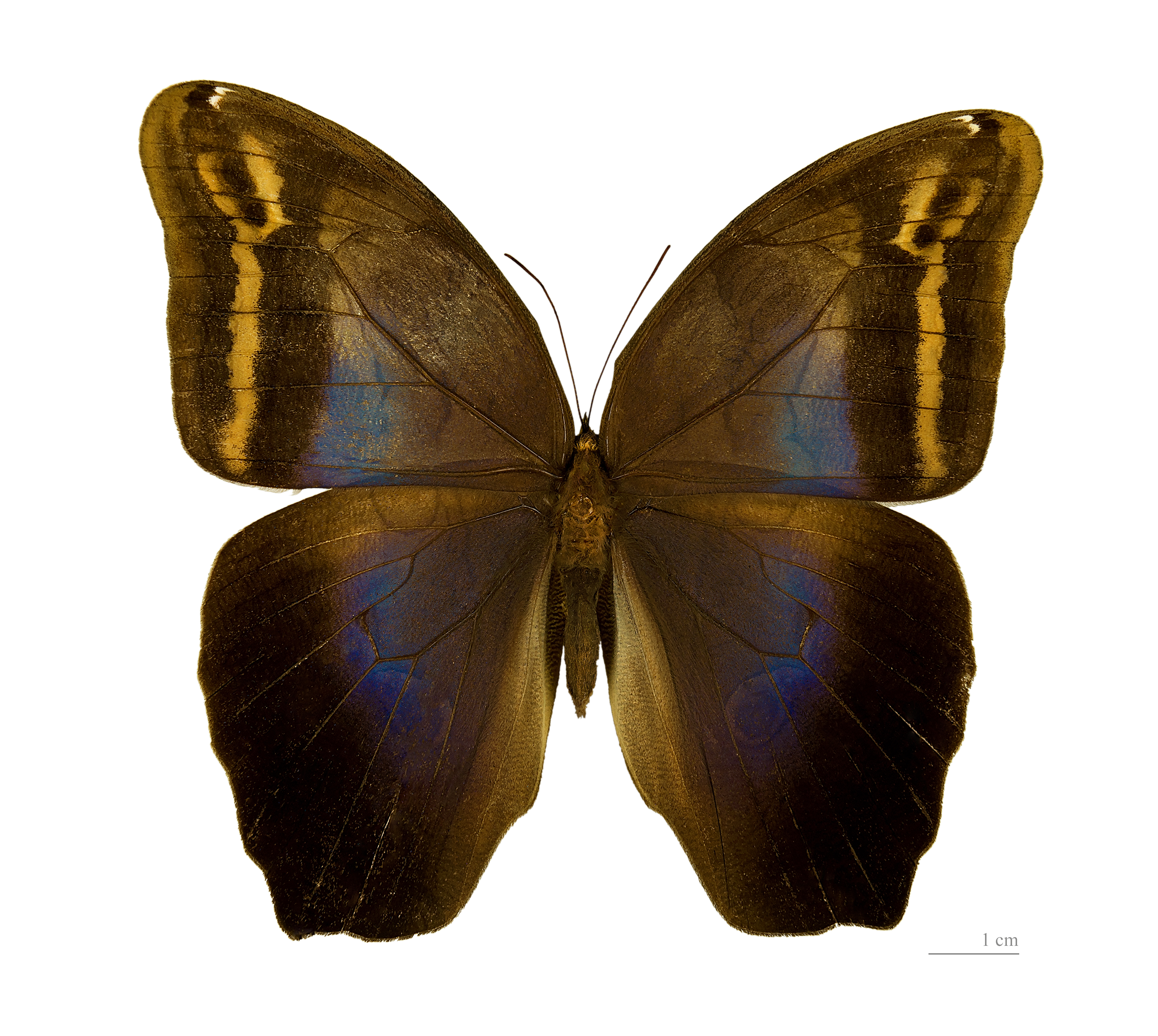
- Eryphanis automedon, type species for the genus

Scientific classification
- Domain: Eukaryota
- Kingdom: Animalia
- Phylum: Arthropoda
- Class: Insecta
- Order: Lepidoptera
- Family: Nymphalidae
- Tribe: Brassolini
- Genus: Eryphanis; Boisduval, 1870

= Eryphanis =

Genus of brush-footed butterflies

Eryphanis is a genus of owl butterflies in the family Nymphalidae.

== Species ==
- polyxena species group
  - Eryphanis automedon (Cramer, [1775])
- aesacus species group
  - Eryphanis aesacus (Herrich-Schäffer, 1850)
  - Eryphanis bubocula (Butler, 1872)
  - Eryphanis gerhardi (Weeks, 1902)
  - Eryphanis reevesii (Doubleday, [1849])
  - Eryphanis zolvizora (Hewitson, 1877)
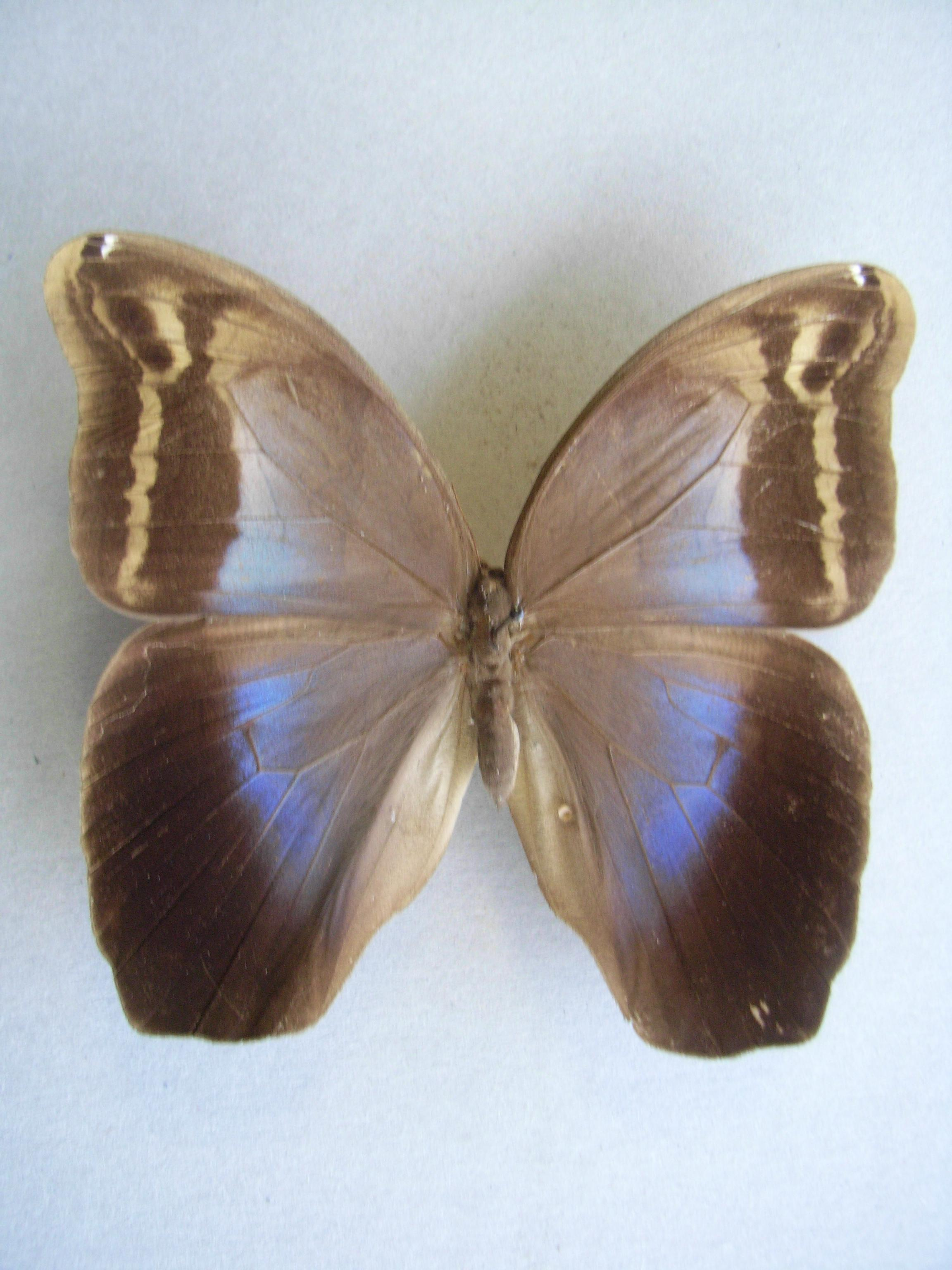
Eryphanis aesacus

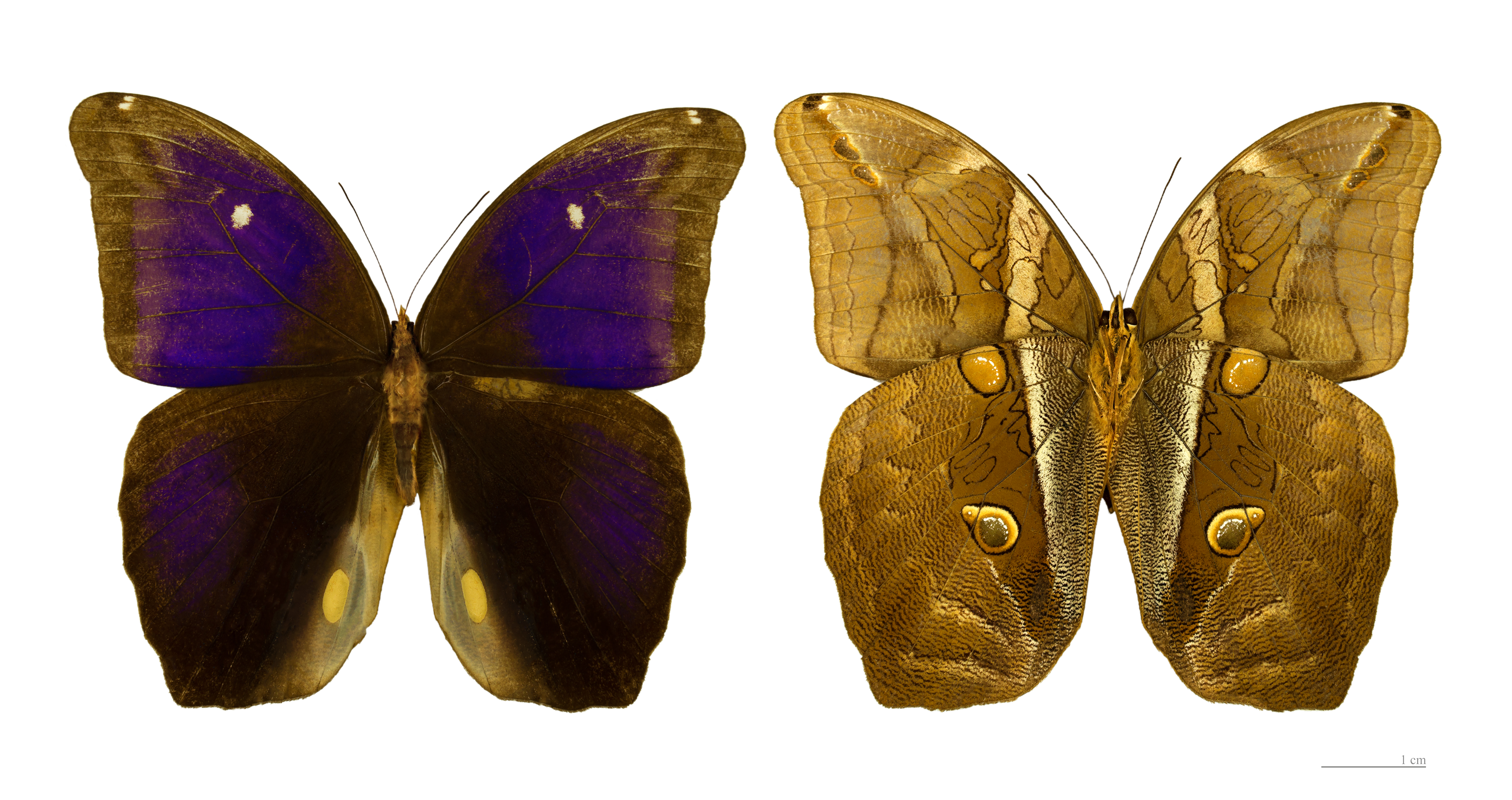
Eryphanis automedon - MHNT
