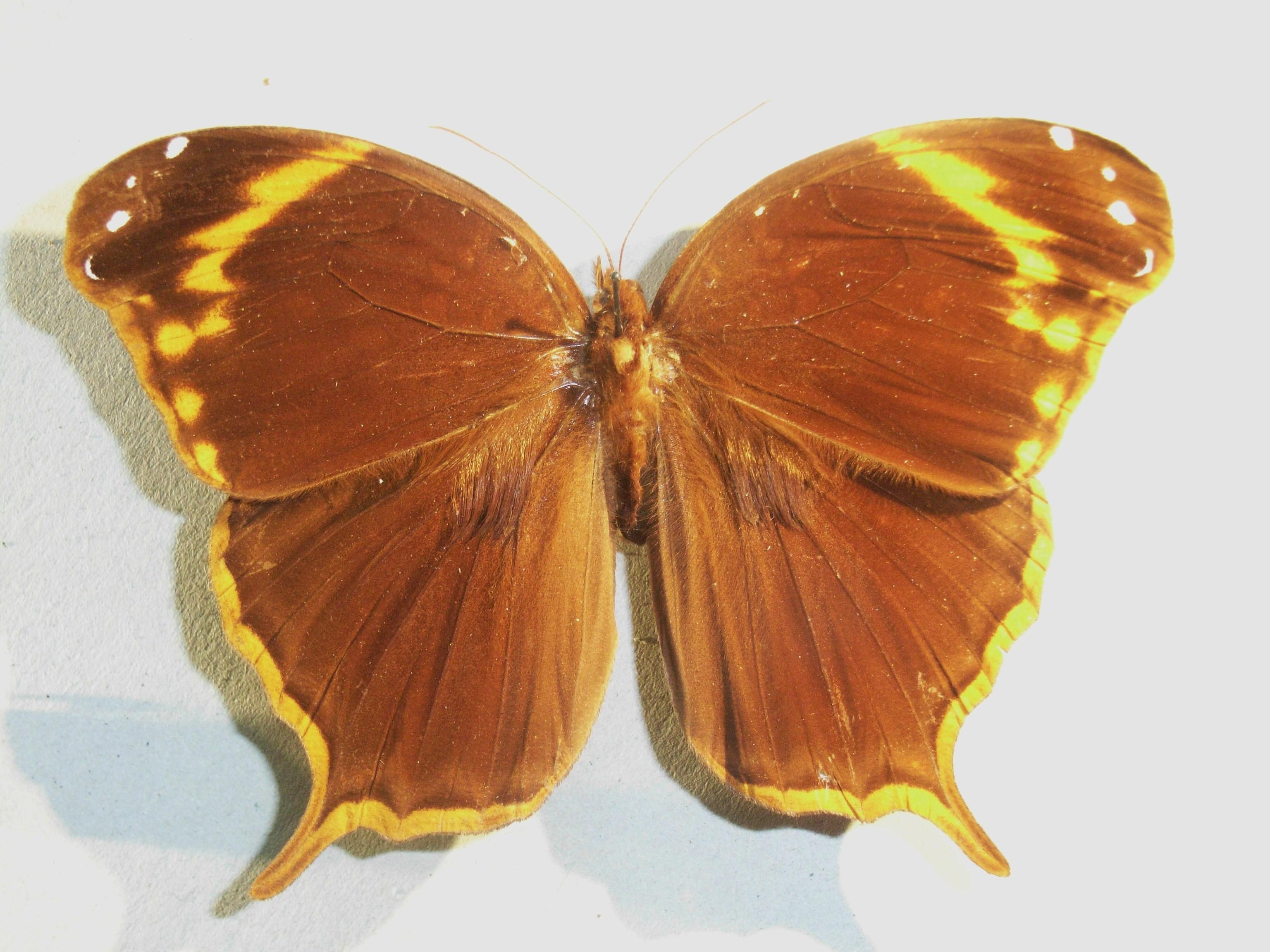

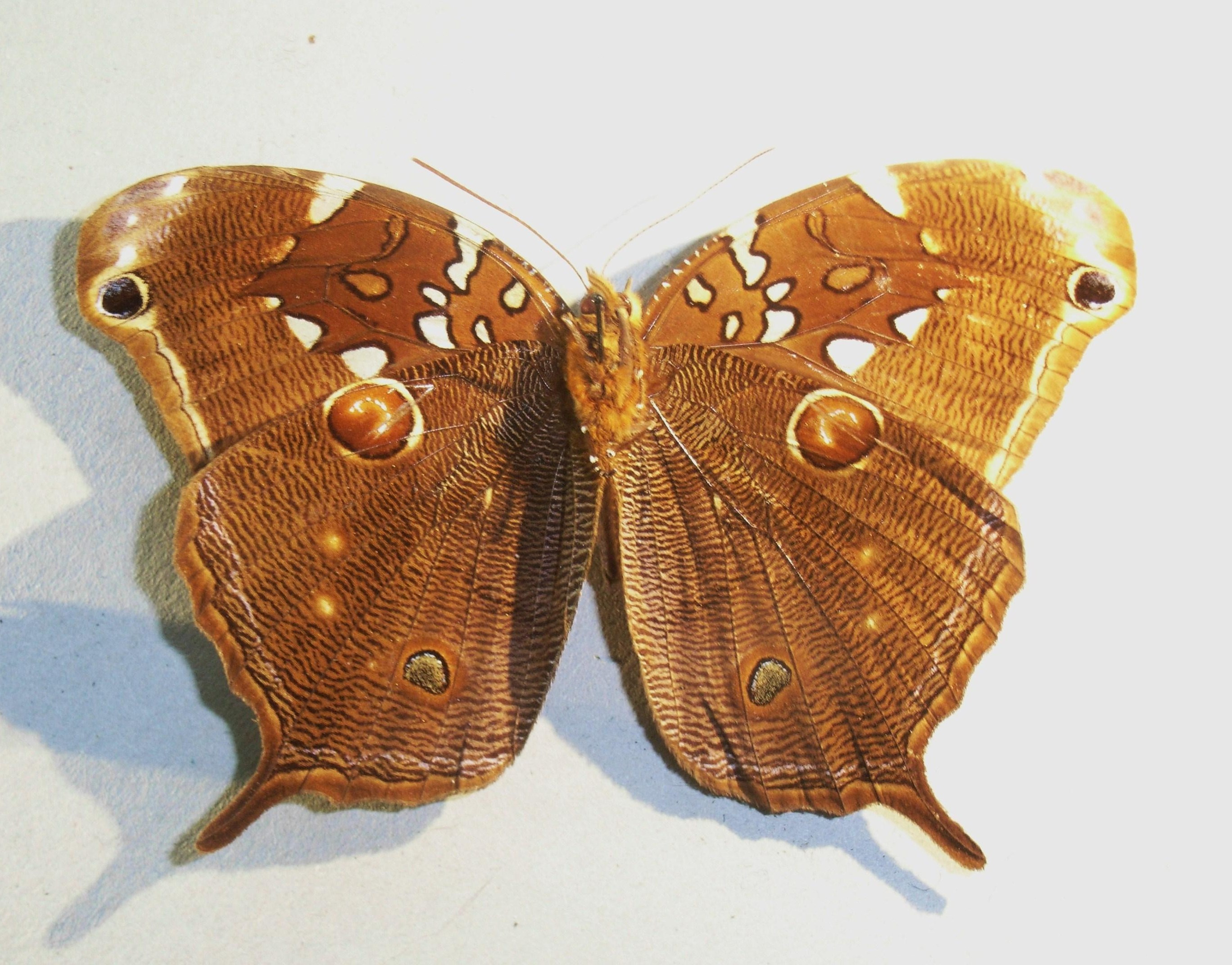
- underside (verso)

Scientific classification
- Kingdom: Animalia
- Phylum: Arthropoda
- Class: Insecta
- Order: Lepidoptera
- Family: Nymphalidae
- Genus: Opoptera
- Species: O. arsippe

Binomial name
- Opoptera arsippe (Hopffer, 1874)

= Opoptera arsippe =

Species of butterfly

Opoptera arsippe is a Neotropical species of butterfly of the family Nymphalidae described by Carl Heinrich Hopffer in 1874) It is endemic to Peru.

== Description ==
The oblique band of the forewing dark ochreous and posteriorly strongly angled, otherwise smooth, distally somewhat broken. There are three small white spots in the apical area the middle one placed somewhat distally; a fourth appears as a small crescent or curved streak at the distal boundary of the eye-spot, which shows through from beneath. In the female the distal border of the hindwing is of a somewhat lighter tone than in the male. Near the costal margin in the apical area there is in addition an isolated ochre-yellow spot; the tail-like point at the lower median vein darker brown. Length of the forewing male 40—41, female 42 mm.
