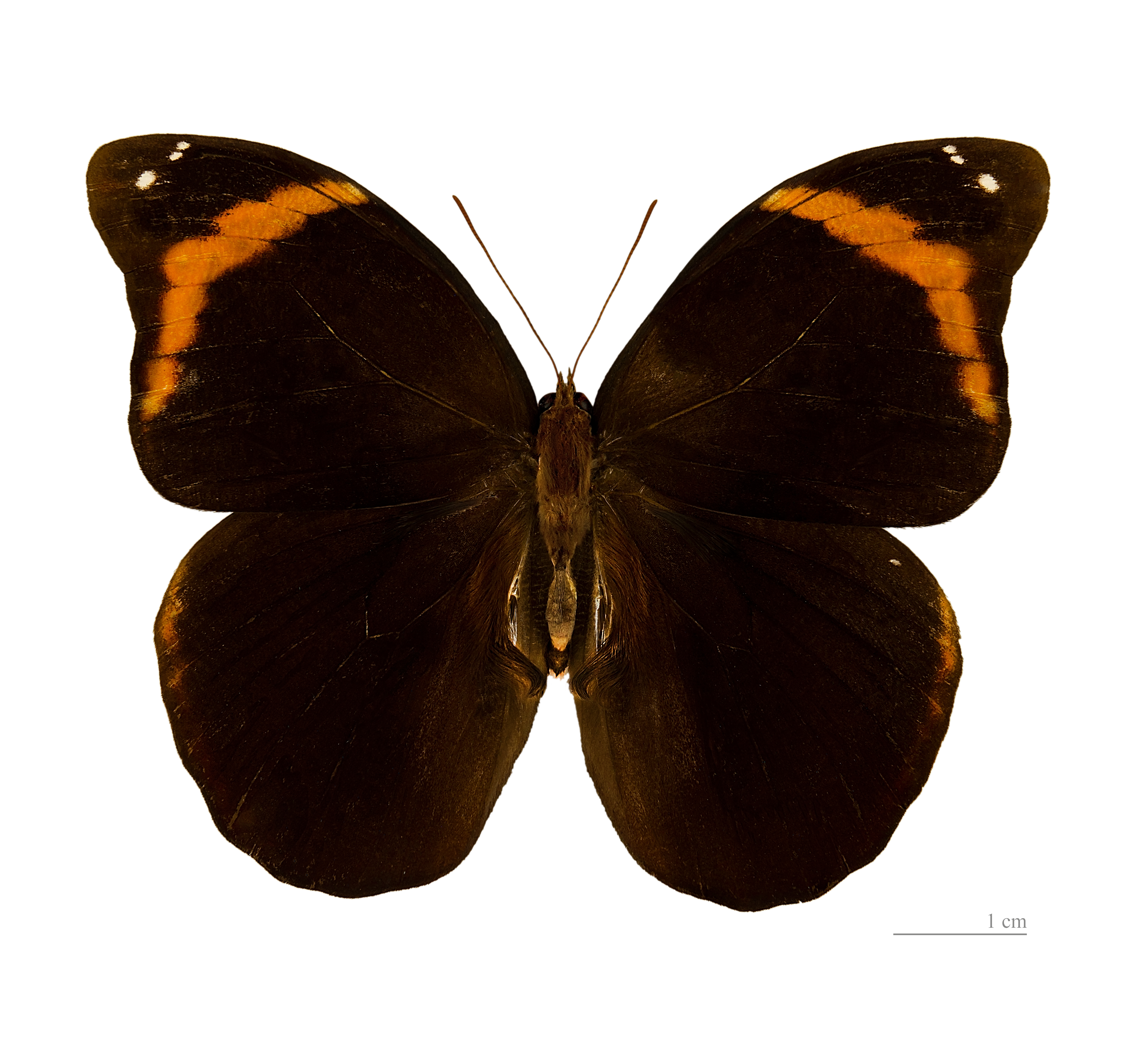
- Type species: Catoblepia xanthus - MHNT

Scientific classification
- Domain: Eukaryota
- Kingdom: Animalia
- Phylum: Arthropoda
- Class: Insecta
- Order: Lepidoptera
- Family: Nymphalidae
- Tribe: Brassolini
- Genus: Catoblepia; Stichel, 1902

Diversity
- 8 species

= Catoblepia =

Genus of brush-footed butterflies

Catoblepia is a genus of Neotropical butterflies in the family Nymphalidae. Larvae feed on bananas and adults feed on rotting fruit.

== Species ==
Listed alphabetically within groups:

- The generosa species group:
  - Catoblepia berecynthia (Cramer, [1777])
  - Catoblepia generosa (Stichel, 1902)
- The xanthus species group:
  - Catoblepia amphirhoe (Hübner, [1825])
  - Catoblepia versitincta (Stichel, 1901)
  - Catoblepia xanthicles (Godman & Salvin, [1881])
  - Catoblepia xanthus (Linnaeus, 1758)
- Unknown species group:
  - Catoblepia orgetorix (Hewitson, 1870) – Orgetorix owl
  - Catoblepia soranus (Westwood, 1851)
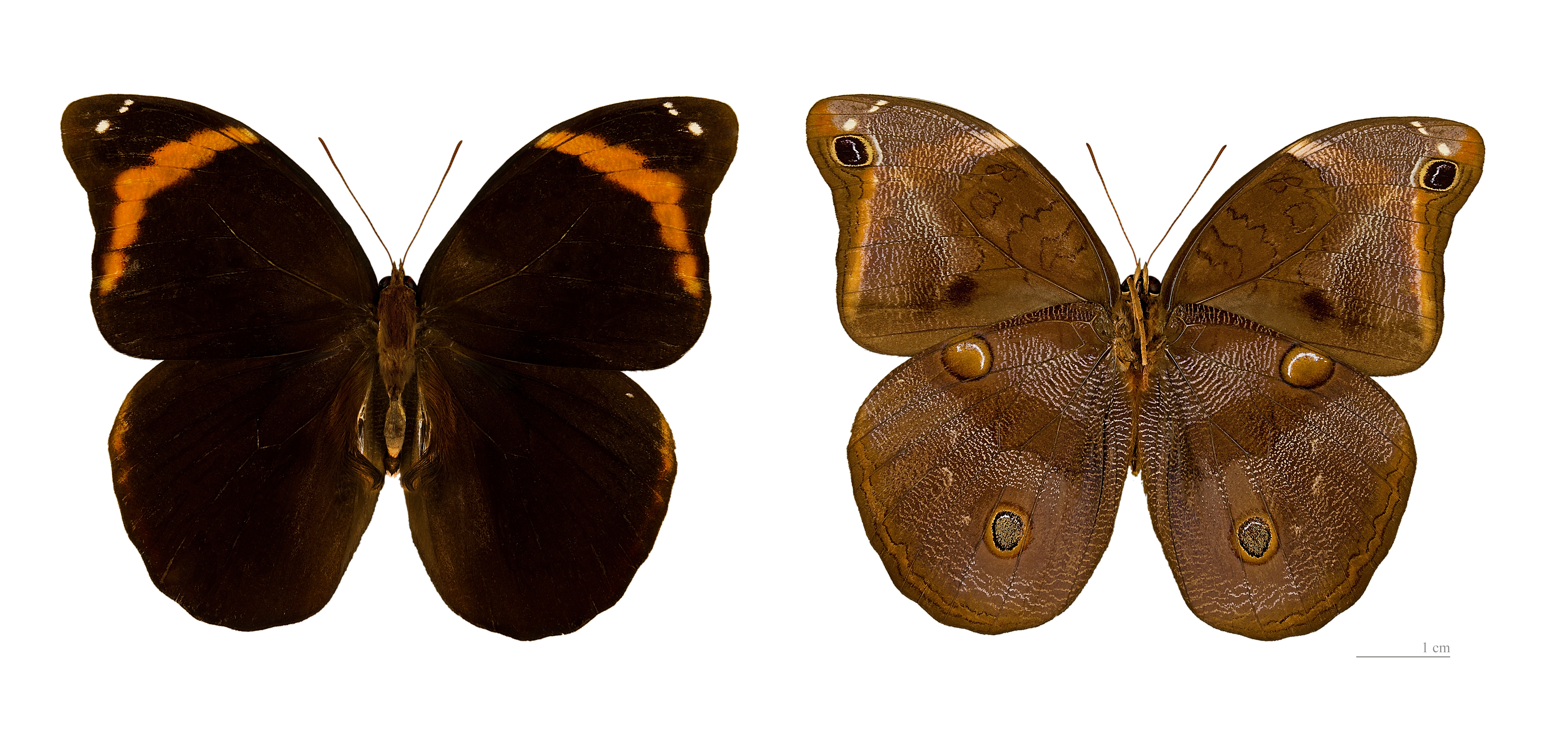
Catoblepia xanthus - MHNT
