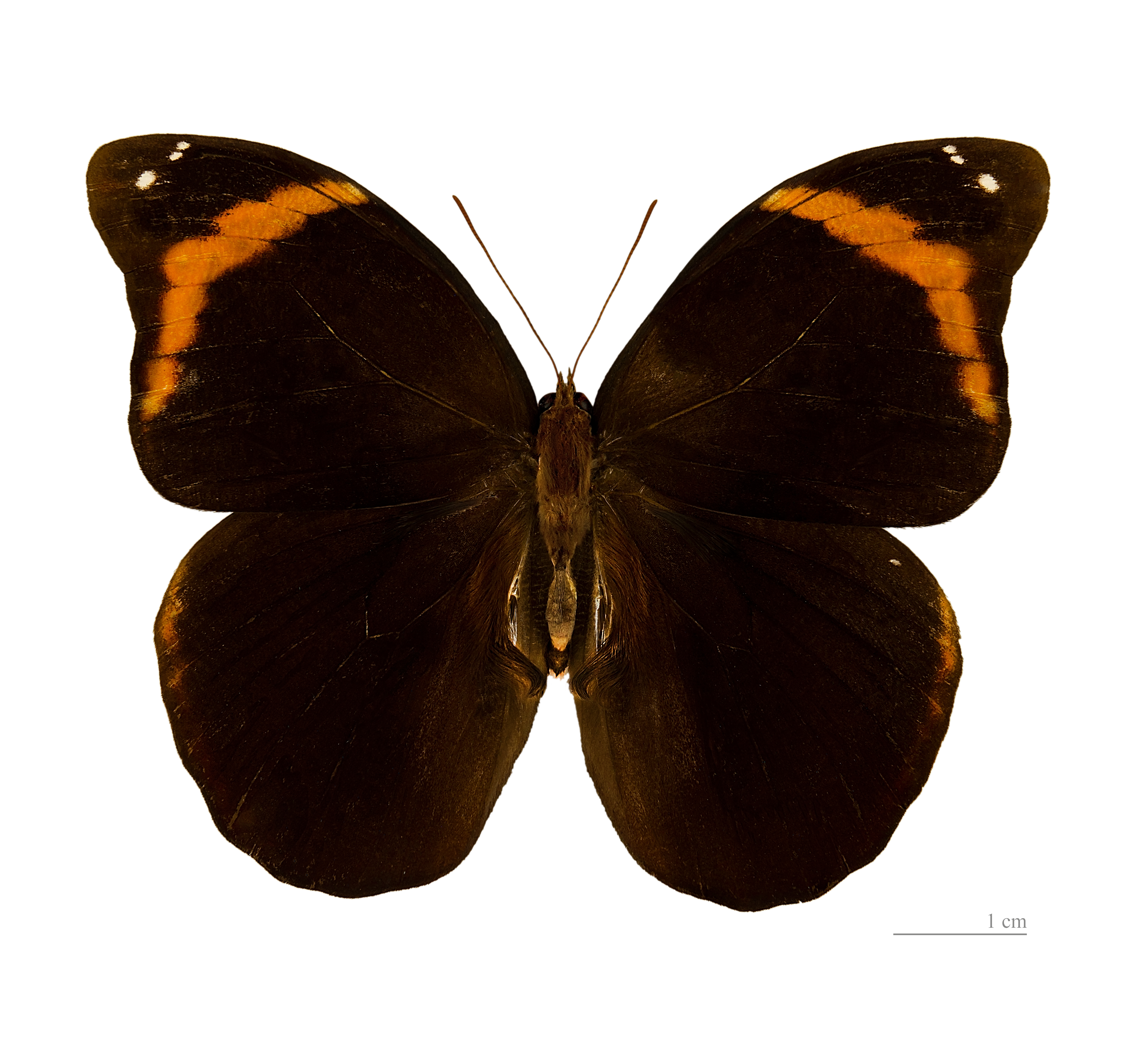
- MHNT
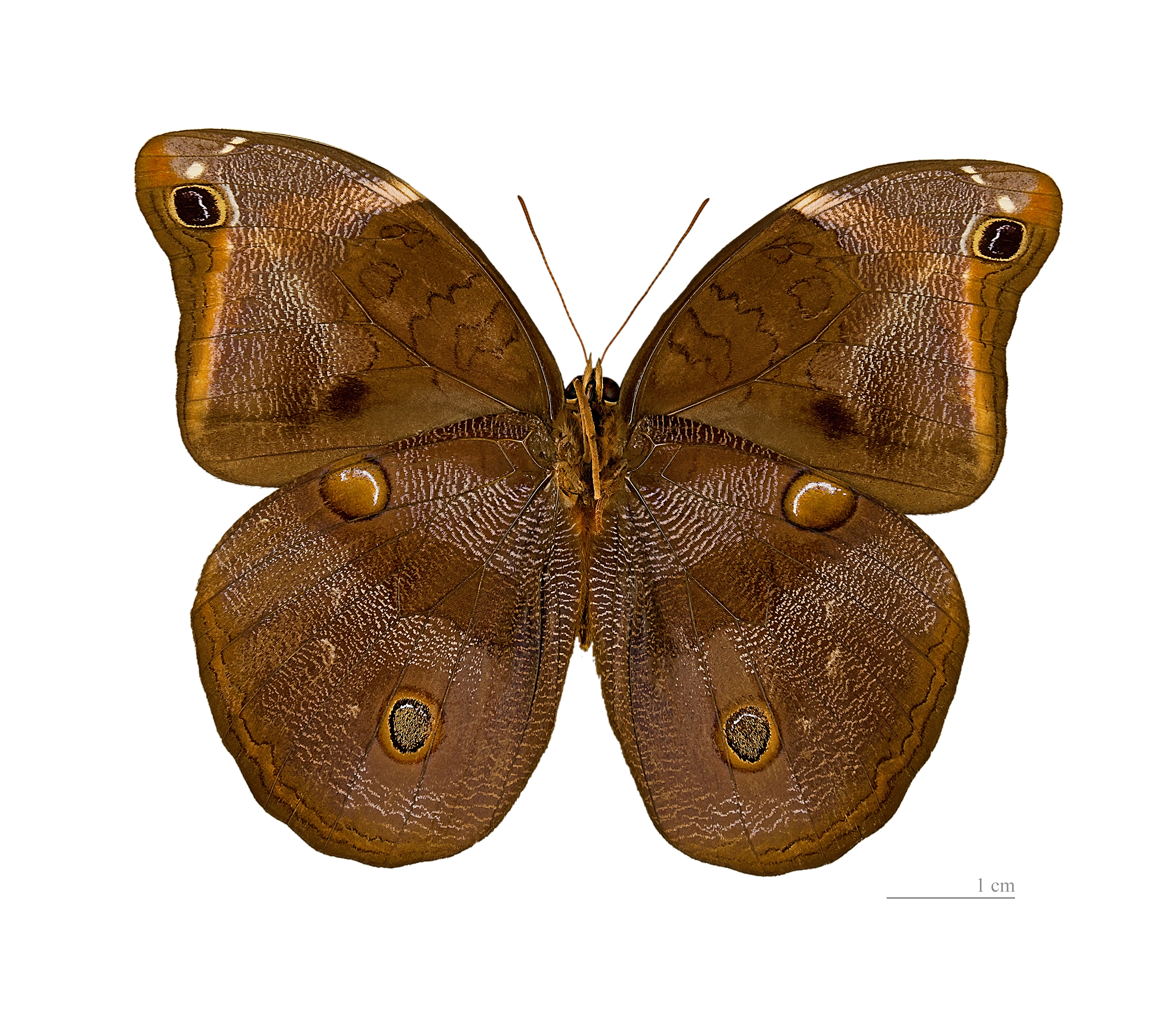
- Ventral side - MHNT

Scientific classification
- Kingdom: Animalia
- Phylum: Arthropoda
- Class: Insecta
- Order: Lepidoptera
- Family: Nymphalidae
- Genus: Catoblepia
- Species: C. xanthus

Binomial name
- Catoblepia xanthus (Linnaeus, 1758)

Synonyms
- Papilio xanthus Linnaeus, 1758; Brassolis xanthis Hübner, [1819]

= Catoblepia xanthus =

Species of butterfly

Catoblepia xanthus is a butterfly of the family Nymphalidae. It is found in northern South America.

== Description ==
'Catoblepia xanthus is a butterfly with forewings that have a strongly curved costal margin and a concave outer margin. The upper side of the wings is very dark brown with an orange band on the forewings that extends from the outer third of the costal margin to the outer third of the outer margin, then forms a submarginal band to the outer angle. The hindwings are brown with an orange-edged inner margin.

The underside is pearly golden beige with an eyespot at the apex of the forewings and two large orange eyespots on the hindwings.

== Subspecies ==
- Catoblepia xanthus xanthus (Peru, Guianas)
- Catoblepia xanthus rivalis Niepelt, 1911 (Ecuador)
