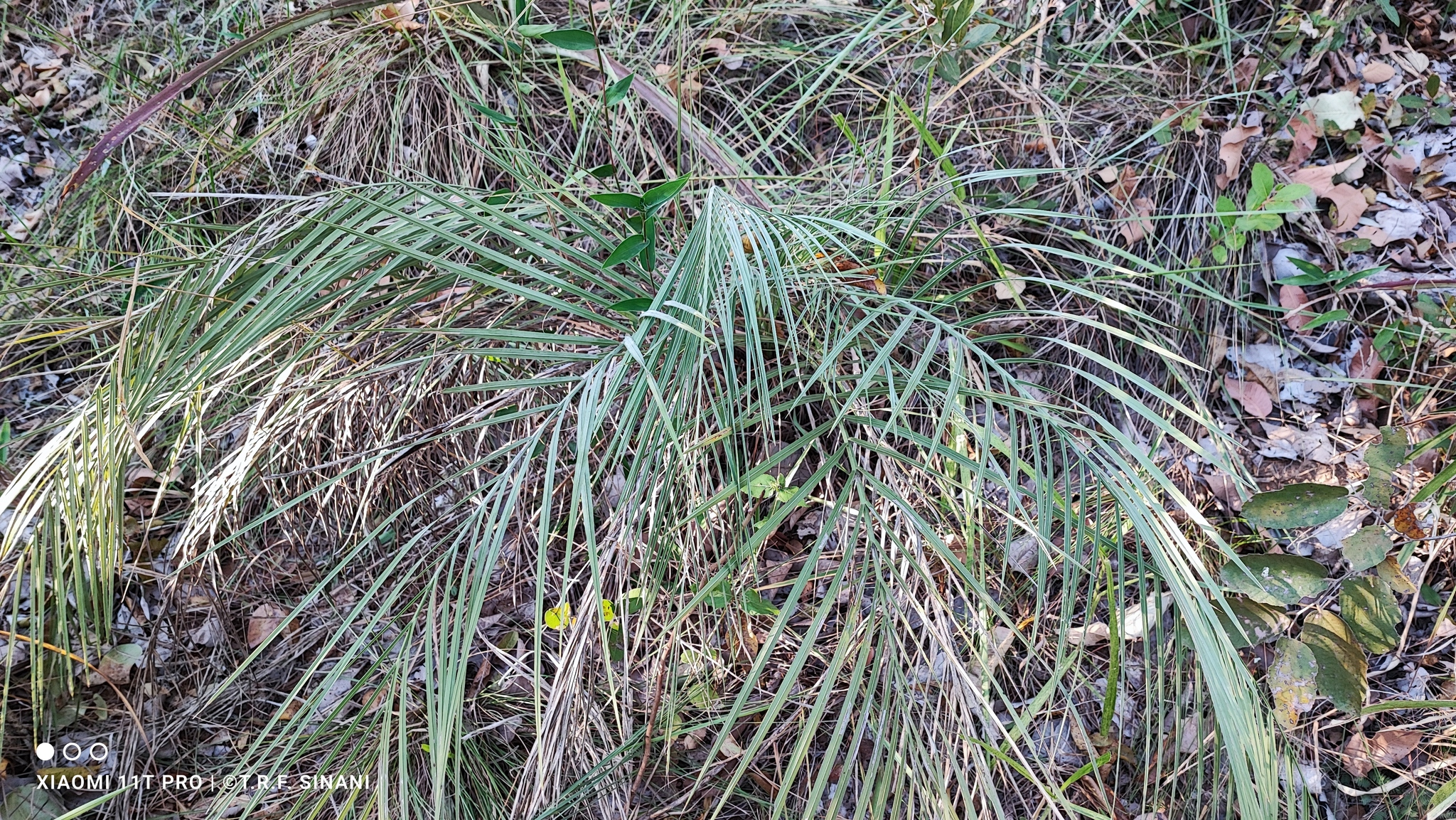

Scientific classification
- Kingdom: Plantae
- Clade: Tracheophytes
- Clade: Angiosperms
- Clade: Monocots
- Clade: Commelinids
- Order: Arecales
- Family: Arecaceae
- Genus: Butia
- Species: B. matogrossensis

Binomial name
- Butia matogrossensis Noblick & Lorenzi [2010]

= Butia matogrossensis =

Palm native to Brazil

Butia matogrossensis is a small species of Butia palm with a trunk of only 0.5 m (20 in) in height or often subterranean, native to the cerrados of the centre, central-east, northeast and likely north of the state of Mato Grosso do Sul, after which it is named, in south-central Brazil. It also occurs in neighbouring south-central Goiás to the north. It is endemic to Brazil, occurring only in this country.

== Etymology ==
The specific epithet refers to the Brazilian state of Mato Grosso do Sul where it was first found.

== Taxonomy ==
The taxon was first collected in 2000 by E.R. Salviani and Harri Lorenzi in the municipality of Três Lagoas in Mato Grosso do Sul. It was collected again at this locality by Rodrigo Tsuji in 2007. In 2008 a group of botanists consisting of Larry R. Noblick, Lorenzi, Tsuji and R. Ventura collected the taxon again (Tsuji2674).

In 2010 Noblick eventually described B. matogrossensis from the afore-mentioned collections, as well as B. catarinensis and B. pubispatha, in the Flora brasileira: Arecaceae (palmeiras) by Lorenzi et al. (Noblick also described B. lepidotispatha in 2010).

The holotype selected was the last of the afore-mentioned collections, Tsuji2674 from 2008.

It was apparently also collected by Kelen Pureza Soares and R. Pimenta in 2012 in the municipality of Água Clara, Mato Grosso do Sul, Brazil, although the georeferenced data provided shows a location in Três Lagoas near the three earlier afore-mentioned collections.

== Description ==
This is a small solitary-trunked palm, the trunk can grow above ground or be subterranean, growing up to 0.5 m (20 in) high and 14 cm (5.5 in) in diameter. It has 6-15 leaves. The 11–19 cm (4.3–7.5 in) long by 1.2–1.3 cm (0.47–0.51 in) wide petiole of the leaf has toothed margins. The rachis of the leaf is 45–63 cm (18–25 in) in length and bears 23-32 pairs of pinnae (leaflets). These pinnae are arranged on a single plane on each side of the rachis, such that the pairs form a V-shape down the leaf blade. The pinnae are sized 30–45 cm (12–18 in) in length and 0.8–1.2 cm (0.3–0.5 in) in width in the middle of the leaf. The developing inflorescence is protected within a hairless, woody spathe 33–55 cm (13–22 in) in length, with the enlarged part of the spathe being 20–30 cm (8–12 in) long and 3.8–6.7 cm (1.5–2.6 in) in width. The inflorescence is branched with 7-35 rachillae (branches) which are 8–22 cm (3–9 in) in length. The flowers are coloured purple. The staminate (male) flowers are 10–12 mm (0.4–0.5 in) in length; the pistillate (female) flowers are 8–9 mm (0.3–0.4 in) in length. The shape of the fruit is ovoid; the nut is an ellipsoid/ovoid shape and contains 1-3 seeds. Ripe fruit has a yellow and sweet-sour flesh. The ripe fruit is described as coloured purplish-green, green or red.

At the type locality a plant has been found with a trunk to 1 m (39 in) high, although this would appear to be rare.

The leaves arch strongly back down towards the trunk and are described as coloured "pale bluish green", "mint green" or "green-blue".

=== Similar species ===
It is extremely similar to Butia capitata, juvenile specimens of that species being very easy to confuse with this one. According to Soares in 2015 the main difference between these two species is that B. matogrossensis has much smaller fruit with a purplish hue, compared to the big yellow fruit of B. capitata. Noblick in his 2014 key to the genus Butia also contrasts it to B. capitata, distinguishing the two species from each other by B. matogrossensis having a usually subterranean trunk, a shorter leaf rachis, less pinnae, a smaller swollen portion of the spathe, much less rachillae and the ripe fruit being green or purplish-green as opposed to yellow. It is also very similar to B. arenicola, but is much larger than this dwarf species. Marcelo Piske Eslabão in his 2017 key to the genus contrasts it to B. arenicola, distinguishing the two species by B. matogrossensis having generally red fruit as opposed to yellow, and a petiole almost twice as wide, a spathe over twice as wide, and larger pistillate flowers.

It grows in the same regional vicinity as B. archeri and B. purpurascens in southern Goiás, and B. arenicola and B. campicola in Mato Grosso do Sul, with B. paraguayensis occurring just to the west, south and east of its range.

== Distribution ==
It is native to the cerrados of the state of Mato Grosso do Sul, in south-central Brazil. In 2015 Soares wrote that it had a very restricted distribution in the east of Mato Grosso do Sul in the neighbouring municipalities of Água Clara and Três Lagoas, but as of 2017 more collection localities have been identified. These include collections in the municipalities of Campo Grande and Terenos by A.C. Marcato in 2001 (at the University of São Paulo herbarium), collections in Campo Grande in 2005 and Inocência in 2008 by Roberto Tsuji (at the Jardim Botânico Plantarum) in the central and north-eastern regions of Mato Grosso do Sul.

On the Flora do Brasil 2020 website it states that this species also occurs in the neighbouring state of Goiás. It is unclear what substantiates this distribution as none of the specimen vouchers cited were collected in this state. In 2009 a specimen was collected in the municipality of Caiapônia in south-central Goiás by Renata Corrêa Martins et al. which she herself considered Butia archeri in her 2012 dissertation, but which Eslabão classified as B. matogrossensis in his 2017 thesis.

This plant has thus only been collected nine times since 2000, in at least five localities, as of 2017. With an estimated area of occupancy (AOO) of some 7,000km^{2} within an estimated extent of occurrence (EOO) of approximately 11,300km^{2}, it has a calculated abundance of 62%, which is average to good compared to other species within the genus Butia.

=== Habitat ===
It grows in a shrubby subtype of cerrado known as 'central Brazilian savannah'. It appears to prefer sandy soils. The elevation has only been measured at one of its collection localities, this was at 330m altitude in Três Lagoas. It has often been found growing in the berms along highways, at least initially.

== Horticulture ==
Seeds are difficult to germinate. According to one grower the best results were obtained germinating them in quite dry peat. USDA hardiness zone 9b.

Seed has been sold by speciality seed vendors since at least 2015. Seedlings have been sold in Germany.

== Conservation ==
As of 2018 the Centro Nacional de Conservação da Flora has not yet rated the conservation status for Brazil, and it is listed as 'not evaluated'. Eslabão in his 2017 thesis classifies Butia matogrossensis as 'vulnerable' as the IUCN categories B1a,b(i, ii, iii) apply; this means that the estimated EOO (see Distribution above) was lower than 20,000km^{2}, it occurs in less than 10 localities, and that according to Eslabão the population was highly fragmented and in decline. According to Lorenzi et al. in 2010 the region whence it inhabits was experiencing an increase in soya cultivation. It is not known to occur and/or be protected within any conservation area. It was grown ex situ in the Jardim Botânico Plantarum in Nova Odessa, São Paulo, Brazil, by 2017.
