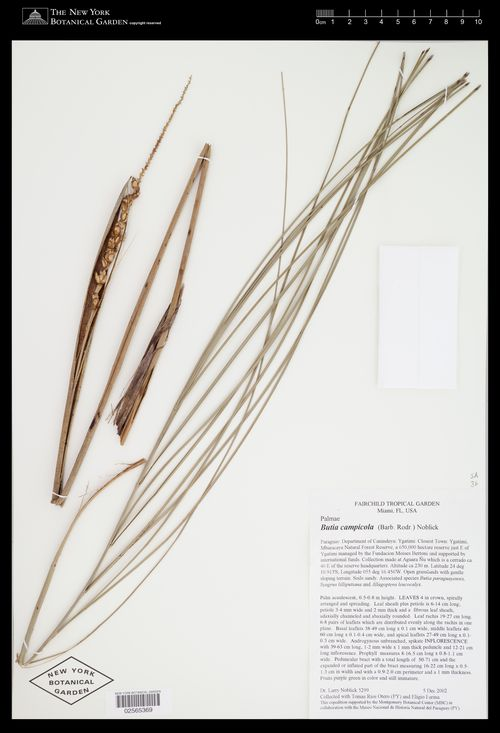
- Preserved specimen from Paraguay

Scientific classification
- Kingdom: Plantae
- Clade: Tracheophytes
- Clade: Angiosperms
- Clade: Monocots
- Clade: Commelinids
- Order: Arecales
- Family: Arecaceae
- Genus: Butia
- Species: B. campicola

Binomial name
- Butia campicola (Barb.Rodr.) Noblick, 2004

Synonyms
- Cocos campicola Barb.Rodr., 1900; Syagrus campicola (Barb.Rodr.) Becc., 1916

= Butia campicola =

Species of palm

Butia campicola is a very small species of Butia palm with an underground trunk; native to the cerrados of central Paraguay and south-central Brazil.

== Etymology and common names ==
The species epithet campicola is derived from its preferred habitat; the campos, Portuguese for grassland. A local name for it in Paraguay in the Guaraní language was recorded as yataycapii. This name should likely be spelled yata'i kapi'i and translates as 'forage/straw/grass Butia'.

== Taxonomy and history ==
It was first collected by the Swiss physician and botanist Émile Hassler in Paraguay in the Sierra de Mbaracayú between 1898 and 1899, and in Piribebuy in 1900, according to the labels on his herbarium specimens. It was formally described by João Barbosa Rodrigues in the 1900 published part of the Plantae Hasslerianae as Cocos campicola. Subsequently, it was never seen again.

In 1996 it was rated as 'endangered' in a publication of the IUCN, in which rediscovery was mentioned as a priority. The species was rediscovered that same year by Belen Jiménez in one of the areas it was first collected, in the grasslands of the Aguara Ñu in what was by now the Mbaracayú Forest Nature Reserve; this was published in 1998. Noblick excluded it from the 1998 IUCN Red List of Threatened Species. Actually the palms had already been collected earlier in 1995 and 1996 in San Pedro Department in Paraguay, but these specimens were only recognised as such by Henderson in 1999, and this information was first published 2000.

In 1916 Odoardo Beccari moved this taxon from Cocos to Syagrus along with many South American Cocos taxa. By 1995 a number of researchers had been convinced it was in fact a species of Butia, and had taken to calling it as such, despite it never being formally moved to Butia (fide Henderson et al. [1995], IUCN [1996]). Noblick finally did this in 2004.

In 1973 a specimen of 'trunkless' palm was collected in Nova Andradina, which was identified by Glassman to be B. paraguayensis in 1980. Similarly, in 1987 an abundant population of subterranean-trunked palms had been recorded and collected in Porto Murtinho, Mato Grosso do Sul, Brazil, 57 km east of the capital. These had been determined to be B. paraguayensis by Noblick in 1992. Both collections seem to have been reclassified as B. campicola by 2015. A 2000 collection by Soares from a population of dwarf palms in Goiás were determined to be B. campicola (by others), but these have now been reclassified. Other collections of this B. campicola in Brazil were made in 2009 in Iguatemi and at a spot in Amambai where it was locally common.

Because this plants had in fact been collected earlier before but had not been identified or identified as B. paraguayensis, Belen Jiménez thus did not actually 'rediscover' the species; what she and her co-authors did, in fact, was being the first to correctly identify these palms in their collections.

== Description ==
It is a very small palm with a short, squat, subterranean truck, usually single-stemmed, approximately 15 cm in diameter. It may sometimes, rarely, branch underground with 2-3 heads. The entire plant is less than 1m in height, often less, the thin, glaucous leaflets and invisible trunk make it most resemble a tuft of blueish-grey grass, and it is easily overlooked. The 3-9 arching leaves have a 4–20 cm petiole and 19–77 cm rachis. The 25–62 cm pinnae (leaflets) are evenly arranged 2 cm apart in a single plane on each side, so that each pinnae pair makes a neat 'V'-shape. There are 6-16 pinnae per side. The 40–70 cm peduncular bract (or spathe) is woody and smooth, The inflorescence is simple, very rarely branched, with a peduncle of 42–77 cm and a flower spike 9–21 cm long. The oval to round fruit are 1.8 × 1.5 cm and greenish-purple to brown (when exposed to the elements), with sweet-sour, yellow flesh and almost always a single roundish seed.

=== Similar species ===
According to Barbosa Rodrigues in 1900 it is quite similar to Syagrus petraea, especially in habitus, but the fruit and flowers are very different. According to Noblick in 2006 it is most similar to Butia leptospatha, differing by having a much larger, longer and more robust spathe and inflorescence, the spathe width being thicker and the texture more leathery. Deble et al. in 2006 compare it to B. lallemantii; noting it is much smaller, branches much less often and less when it does, and has different shaped and coloured fruit. According to Soares in 2015 it can be distinguished from all other acaulescent Butia species which possess an inflorescence passing beyond the length of the spathe, by having the longest leaf rachis.

It occurs in the same range as Butia arenicola, B. exospadix, B. lepidotispatha, B. leptospatha, and B. paraguayensis.

== Distribution and habitat ==
In Brazil the species occurs in the south of state of Mato Grosso do Sul, where it is locally abundant in some spots. It has been collected in the municipalities of Amambai, Iguatemi, Nova Andradina and Porto Murtinho. In Paraguay it occurs in the departments of Amambay, Canindeyú, Cordillera (only collected in 1900) and San Pedro. It grows in open, sandy spots in cerrado grasslands, often in gently sloping areas with deep red sand soils. It has been collected growing at altitudes of 115 to 485m. It endures occasional frosts in its native habitat. The region in which it grows has marked seasons, with a cooler, wet winter during which low-lying areas may get temporarily flooded, and long hot and dry summers with frequent long droughts. It is found growing associated with the palms Butia paraguayensis, Syagrus lilliputiana and Allagoptera leucocalyx in Mbaracayú, Paraguay.

Irene M. Gauto et al. wrote in 2011 that the species might also occur elsewhere according to their computer-generated population models, and that it was likely under-collected. They stated in 2011 that this taxon was endemic to Paraguay, despite it having been collected in Brazil by this time.

== Horticulture ==
In 2007 there were possibly only two seedlings in cultivation, in England and Argentina. By 2010 it was grown by Harri Lorenzi, a senior Brazilian botanist specialised in palms, in his Plantarum institute. As of 2016 seed of the palm has become more regularly available from niche vendors.

Propagation is by seed. Germination can take months and germination rates are quite low. It is advised to plant the palms in full sunlight. It is said to take −5 °C, but should be protected at 0 °C in the Netherlands. In Nova Odessa (see climate), Brazil, Lorenzi grows his palms on large mounds of loose sandy material.

== Conservation ==
The IUCN briefly rated it as 'endangered' between 1996 and 1998 in a period when nothing was known about the species and it hadn't been recorded in 98 years. Soares in 2015 opined it is rare and threatened due to its preferential deep-soiled habitat which is also perfect for agriculture. Lorenzi also believes it is threatened. Gauto et al. in 2011 considered it to be 'vulnerable' in Paraguay, using the criteria "extent of occurrence estimated to be less than 100km^{2} indicated by severely fragmented habitat or known to exist at only a single location." According to Vera in 2013 it is rare in Paraguay.

It is protected within the Mbaracayú Forest Nature Reserve, but this is the only known locality in which this species is protected. By 2010 there were ex situ plantings of this species at Lorenzi's Plantarum institute in Nova Odessa, collected during an expedition to Amambaí.

As of 2018 the conservation status has not been evaluated by the Centro Nacional de Conservação da Flora in Brazil.
