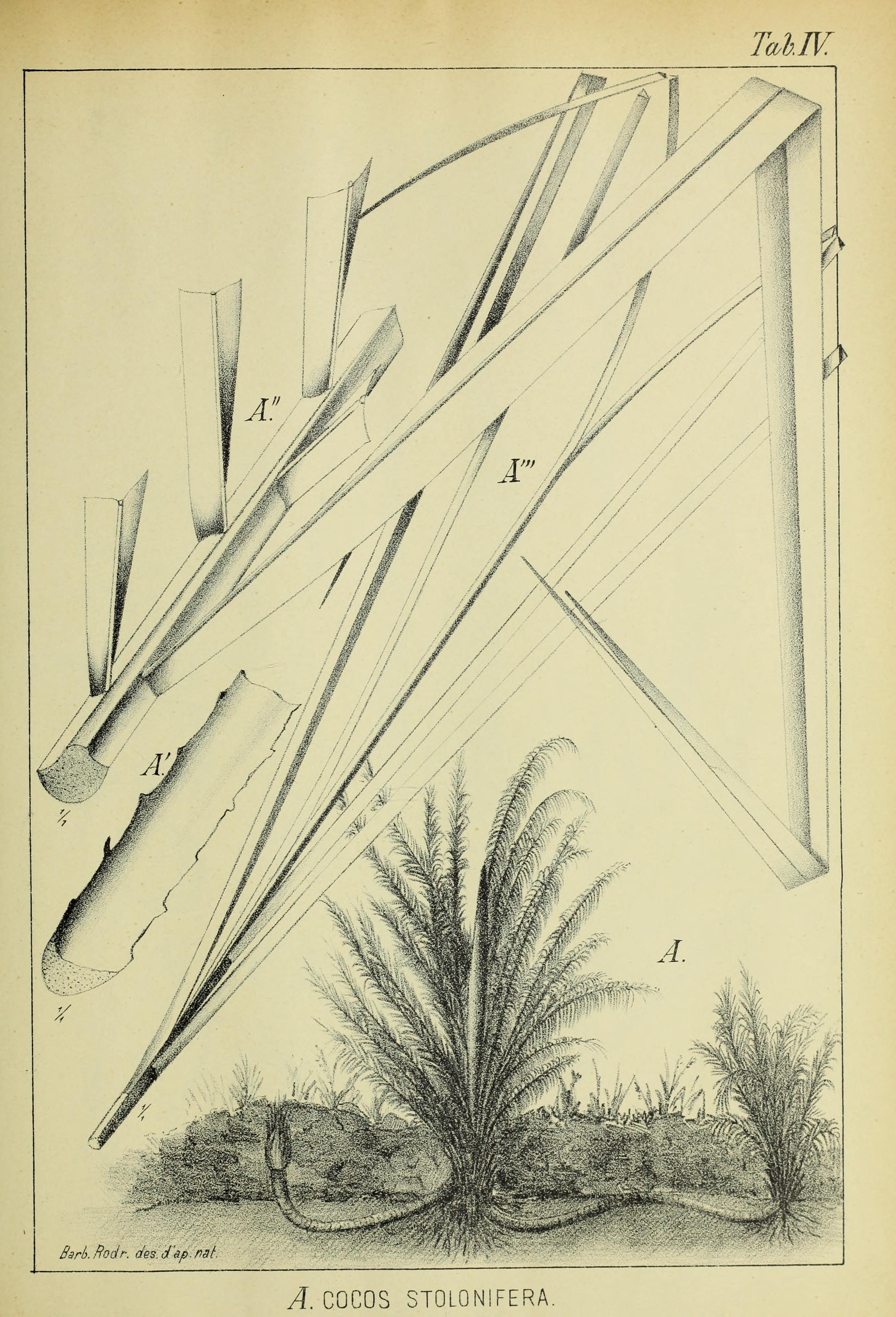
- João Barbosa Rodrigues' original drawing of Butia stolonifera

Scientific classification
- Kingdom: Plantae
- Clade: Tracheophytes
- Clade: Angiosperms
- Clade: Monocots
- Clade: Commelinids
- Order: Arecales
- Family: Arecaceae
- Genus: Butia
- Species: B. stolonifera

Binomial name
- Butia stolonifera (Barb.Rodr.) Becc. 1916

Synonyms
- Cocos stolonifera Barb.Rodr. 1903

= Butia stolonifera =

Species of palm

Butia stolonifera was an oddly growing palm assigned to the genus Butia found only once in Uruguay in the 19th century, but which now is considered to be uncertain as a valid species.

Butia stolonifera was collected in 1869 by professor José Arechavaleta, purportedly from the Pan de Azúcar hill. Two plants were grown from his collection, one at Montevideo and one at the Rio de Janeiro Botanical Garden. By the turn of the century the palm in Rio de Janeiro had become a large mature specimen, and João Barbosa Rodrigues named it as a new species in 1901, calling it Cocos stolonifera. He formally described it in 1903, providing an illustration (shown right).

According to the descriptions by Barbosa Rodrigues, this plant was acaulescent and caespitose, having a number of underground trunks splitting from the crown of roots. If truly a Butia, the plant was unique in that the trunks grew from rhizomes or stolons snaking underground up to a length of two metres; thus the plant colonised a large patch of ground. Barbosa Rodrigues did not describe nor illustrate the flowers of the plant.

In 1916 the great Italian palm expert Odoardo Beccari raised the subgenus Butia to genus, housing a number of former Cocos species, which he distinguished primarily using details of the inflorescence, as well as a number of details of the leaves and the number of locules in the fruit (2–3). On the basis of Barbosa Rodrigues' illustration and descriptions in literature of details of the leaves, such as the spines on the petiole and a bifurcated point at the end of the pinnae (leaflets), Beccari moved Cocos stolonifera to Butia without even having seen the plant or studied Barbosa Rodrigues' herbarium specimen, although he expressed his doubts regarding the placement, having been unable to study the flowers. Both living trees in Montevideo and Rio de Janeiro have long since died and Barbosa Rodrigues' specimens were unfortunately destroyed with much of the rest of his collection.

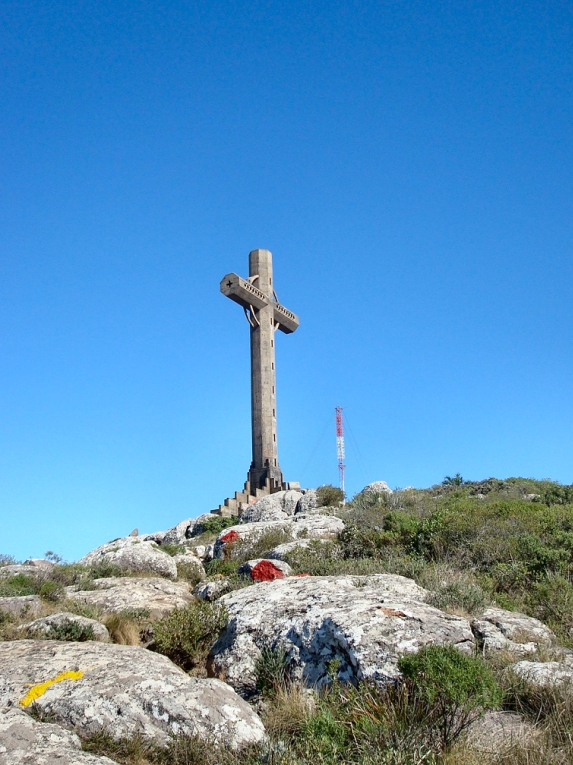
The discovery locality for this palm; Cerro Pan de Azúcar.

In 1939, in his Flora von Uruguay, Wilhelm Gustav Franz Herter included the taxon and provided an illustration of the leaf and inflorescence, attributing the authorship to himself as B. stolonifera (Barb.Rodr.) Hert.

Workers on South American Cocoseae taxonomy after Beccari (i.e. Henderson et al. [1995], Govaerts [1996], and Govaerts & Dransfield [2005]) continued to accept his taxonomy and the validity of the species, but S. F. Glassman in 1970 considered the taxon a nomen dubium, and Kelen Pureza Soares et al. in 2014 published their doubts about the validity of the taxon, both research papers arguing its taxonomic placement as a Butia is in doubt. Having spines along the margin of the petiole is no longer considered a defining characteristic of the genus Butia.

The original description and illustration of this palm most resembled Syagrus campylospatha, but differs primarily in the spines on the margin of the petiole, and the pinnae (leaflets) ending in a bifurcated point, unlike the almost spine-like apex of the pinnae of S. campylospatha.

== Errata ==
A number of sources have this species of palm as occurring in southern Brazil; this would appear to be an error if Glassman and Soares are correct in stating that the plant was only collected once in Uruguay.
