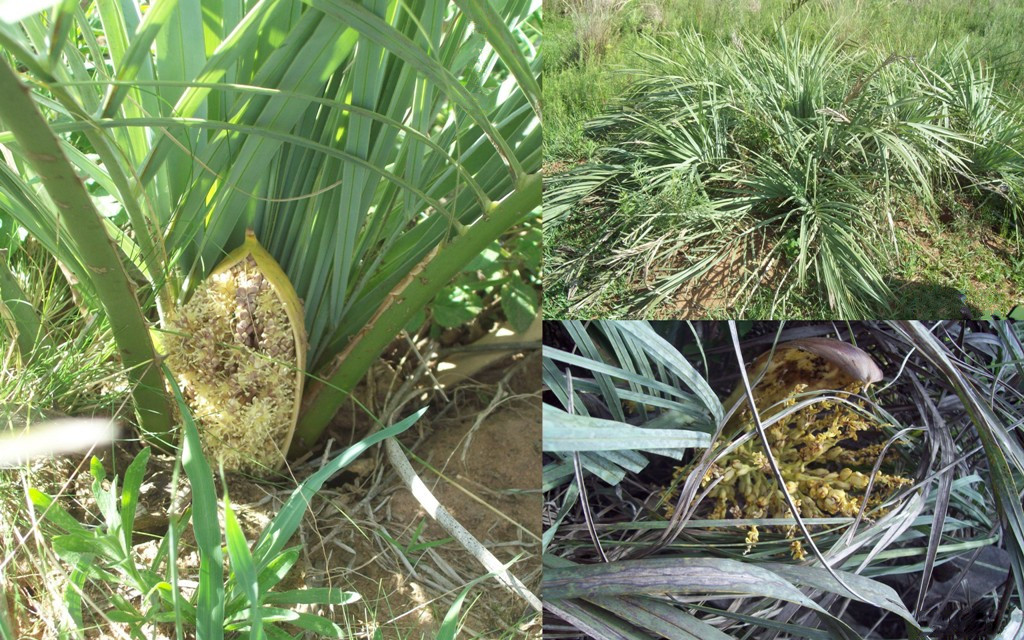

Scientific classification
- Kingdom: Plantae
- Clade: Tracheophytes
- Clade: Angiosperms
- Clade: Monocots
- Clade: Commelinids
- Order: Arecales
- Family: Arecaceae
- Genus: Butia
- Species: B. lallemantii

Binomial name
- Butia lallemantii Deble & Marchiori [2006]

= Butia lallemantii =

Species of palm

Butia lallemantii is a species of palm described in 2006. Unlike more familiar Butia species, this is a clustering, acaulescent species lacking an above-ground trunk. It was the third of such species of Butia described. It is caespitose; branching underground with normally 3-6 branches. It grows to 60–160 cm tall, with 5-12 leaves with 24-40 leaflets a side. The fruit are edible, ovate-lanceolate, yellow-orange, 2.5-3.5 x 1.6-2.5 cm, with a reddish apex.

== Etymology & common names ==
The species epithet was chosen in honour of the German naturalist, doctor and explorer Robert Christian Avé-Lallemant, who mentioned these palms in his writings about his travels in 1858. It is locally known as butiá-anão or butiazeiro-anão in Rio Grande do Sul, also butia-zinho in Brazil, and palmera butiacito in Uruguay.

== Distribution ==
It is found somewhat widespread in an area of southeast Rio Grande do Sul, Brazil and in a fragmented cluster of 8 small subpopulations totalling some 300 plants in a part of Rivera Department in northern Uruguay.

=== Habitat ===
The habitat of this species is typically sandy grasslands (campos arenosos), with red soil, where it can locally be the dominant large plant. It is also found growing in moist red sandy grasslands, on low sandstone slopes and ledges, in open fields and pine forests in Uruguay, as well as dry rocky fields in Brazil. It flowers spring-summer, fruiting summer-autumn.

== Taxonomy ==
This population of Butia palms has been known for a long time (Avé-Lallemant mentioned them in his writings in 1858), but most researchers considered them to be stunted B. paraguayensis (fide Mattos [1977], Marchiori et al. [1995], Marchiori [2004]) until they were described as a new species by Deble and Marchiori in 2006. Nonetheless, an Uruguayan study from 2011 found that it proved to be impossible to differentiate B. lallemantii and B. paraguayensis from each other genetically. Likewise, in their Flora del Arbórea Uruguay of 2007, Brussa & Grela continued to consider it an ecotype.

== Similar species ==
Other similar palm species growing in the area are B. paraguayensis and B. yatay, although these are larger to much larger, single-stemmed palms when mature. The fruits of these trees are different; more oval. B. yatay has almost double the number of pairs of leaflets. The seeds are much rounder than B. paraguayensis with the eyes situated towards one end. The pollen can also be differentiated from these two species; being very similar, but somewhat smaller. B. campicola from Paraguay, being acaulescent, is also similar, although it does not occur near this species. It is much less caespitose, smaller in stature, and with greenish-purple fruits.

A natural hybrid of this species with Syagrus romanzoffiana has been recorded in the wild in Uruguay (Brussa & Grela 2007).

== Uses ==
It is sometimes cultivated. It is advised to plant the palms in full sunlight. It is said to take −11 °C, but should be protected at −4 °C in the Netherlands.

== Conservation ==
In Uruguay this species is now very rare (300 plants) due to habitat loss due to agricultural activities such as cattle ranching and forestry (pulpwood plantations of eucalyptus). Sheep and cattle eat the seedlings, preventing recruitment. Brussa & Grela consider it (as B. paraguayensis) to be endangered in Uruguay in their Flora del Arbórea Uruguay. As of 2017, like all four species of Butia native to Uruguay, it is protected by law. Adult palms may not be felled or moved without government permission.
