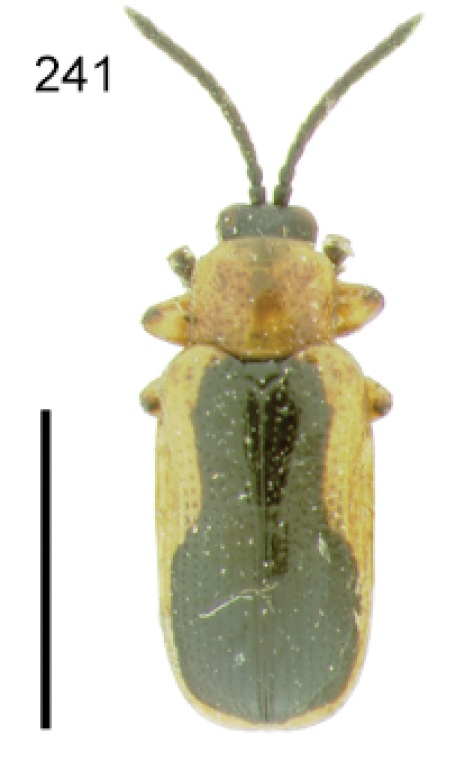

Scientific classification
- Kingdom: Animalia
- Phylum: Arthropoda
- Class: Insecta
- Order: Coleoptera
- Suborder: Polyphaga
- Infraorder: Cucujiformia
- Family: Chrysomelidae
- Genus: Cephaloleia
- Species: C. strandi

Binomial name
- Cephaloleia strandi Uhmann, 1935

= Cephaloleia strandi =

Species of beetle

Cephaloleia strandi is a species of beetle of the family Chrysomelidae. It is found in Brazil (Minas Gerais, Paraná, Río de Janeiro).

== Description ==
Adults reach a length of about 5.2 mm. The head, antennae and scutellum are black and the pronotum is yellowish. The elytron is yellowish with variable black markings.

== Biology ==
Adults have been collected in the flowers of Butia yatay.
