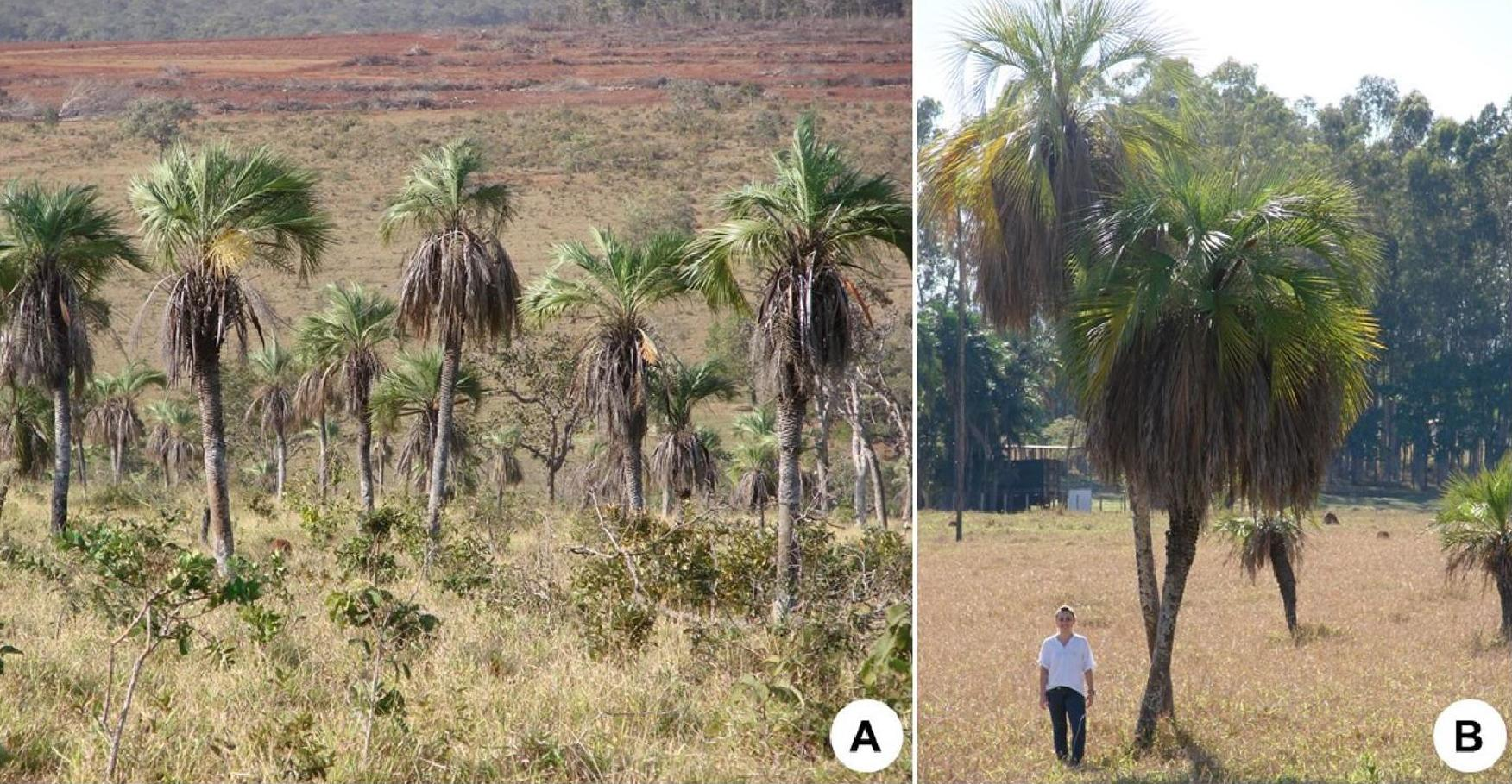

Conservation status
- Vulnerable (IUCN 2.3)

Scientific classification
- Kingdom: Plantae
- Clade: Tracheophytes
- Clade: Angiosperms
- Clade: Monocots
- Clade: Commelinids
- Order: Arecales
- Family: Arecaceae
- Genus: Butia
- Species: B. purpurascens

Binomial name
- Butia purpurascens Glassman

Synonyms
- Butia capitata var. purpurascens (Glassman) Mattos [2008], nom. inval., incorrect basionym ref.

= Butia purpurascens =

Species of palm

Butia purpurascens is a smallish, relatively slender, endangered species of Butia palm, up to 3-7m tall. It is locally known as palmeira-jataí, coqueiro-de-vassoura, butiá or coquinho-azedo in Portuguese. The Kalunga people call this palm cabeçudo.

== Etymology ==
The species epithet is derived from Latin purpureus, meaning 'purple', with the suffix -escens meaning 'becoming', which refers to the purple colour of the fruit, flowers and spathe. The Portuguese vernacular name coqueiro-de-vassoura translates as 'broom-coconut' and refers to the main use of this species. The name palmeira-jataí refers to a Brazilian town around which this palm is prominent.

== Taxonomy ==
It was described by Sidney Fredrick Glassman in 1979, using a holotype he had collected 3 km northeast of the city of Jataí in 1976 (S.F.Glassman13076).

== Description ==
=== Morphology ===
==== Habit ====
This is a solitary-trunked, monoecious palm. Although Glassman described it as 1.2-4m tall in his original description, by 2012 it was known to usually grow to 3-4m, with some individuals reaching 7m in height. Kelen Pureza Soares in his 2015 monograph on the genus Butia gives a height of 1-4m and a trunk diameter of 15–18 cm. This trunk is columnar, growing straight up (never at an angle such as many other caulescent Butia). The trunk is quite slender compared to other caulescent Butia.

==== Leaves ====
The 10-26 leaves are highly arched back towards the trunk, with the total blade length being 77–86 cm. A mature plant with an exposed trunk bears an average of 14 leaves a year. The 83–115 cm petiole of the leaf is unarmed, lacking teeth along its margins. These margins are instead densely fibrous along the lower half of the rachis, becoming less fibrous toward base. The rachis of the leaf is 84–150 cm in length, and has 38-61 pinnae (leaflets) at each side arranged in pairs, more or less evenly spaced, and inserted at an angle on the rachis so that each pair forms a neat 'V'-shape. The pinnae in the middle of the rachis are 45–65 cm long and 1.1–2 cm wide. The apex (tips) of the pinnae are long-acuminate and asymmetrical. The colour of the leaves has been described as bright green, bluish-green or bluish-grey. The leaves are pinnate.

The leaf development is constant throughout the year, but leaf emission peaks during periods with higher temperature and rainfall (usually December, January and February) and are lowest in colder, drier months (June and July).

==== Inflorescence ====
The branched, monoecious inflorescence has a 12–30 cm long prophyll. The inflorescence develops within a woody, glabrous (hairless) spathe which eventually grows 70–105 cm in total length, and has a swollen portion at the end 61–81 cm long and 6–13 cm wide. This swollen portion is often coloured purplish and the whole spathe may sometimes be smooth or striate. The inflorescence has a 35–60 cm long peduncle. The rachis of the inflorescence is 25–49 cm long and has 51-90 rachillae (branches) which are 8–32 cm long. Both sexes of the flowers are coloured purple, although according to Nigel Kembrey, a British horticulturist specialised in Butia, some forms may have yellow flowers. The staminate (male) flowers are 6–7mm in length and have a prominent pedicel (stalk). The pistillate (female) flowers are more or less globose (round), 5–6mm in length, and with sepals and petals about equal in size.

Spathe appearance is opposite to that of leaf emission, with spathes developing after the season of high temperatures and rainfall, with the emission peak happening at the end of the rainy season (usually May to July). There are individual plants in some state of flowering in the population throughout the year.

==== Fruit ====
The shape of the fruit is ovoid, as is the nut. The ripe fruit is 2.3–3 cm long, 1-1.5 cm wide and have a juicy, acidic-sweet flesh. The nut contains 1 to 2 seeds. The ripe fruit is generally the colour purple (or 'wine'), although some forms also carry yellow fruit. The fruit has a beak 4-5mm in length and a persistent perianth 7-8mm high.

The nut is rather small for a Butia.

=== Infraspecific diversity ===
Renata Corrêa Martins in her thesis on the palms of Goiás notes that the population at different localities may differ from each other, with the northern population in Cavalcante having much smaller trunks than the palms found in southeastern Goiás.

=== Similar species ===
It is the only species of Butia without teeth or spines on the petiole which has purple-coloured spathes, flowers and fruit (at maturity).

Glassman in 1979 considered it superficially similar to B. capitata (which included B. odorata at the time), differing primarily from that by the lack of teeth along the margins of the petioles, the long acuminate tips of the pinnae (leaflets) as opposed to obtuse or acute, and the generally purplish spathes, spadices, flowers and fruit. He considered it closely related to B. archeri due to the similar pinnae, the lack of teeth on the petioles, and sizes and shapes of its fruit and flowers, yet differing in always possessing an above-ground trunk, in its larger dimensions of leaves and inflorescences, and in the purplish colour of its flowers and fruit.

In 2015, after many more species had been discovered, Soares continued to consider it the most similar to B. archeri, but this species is distinguishable from B. purpurascens by having much smaller dimensions of its trunk, leaves and inflorescence.

In Goiás, where most of the population resides, the species B. archeri and B. capitata also occur, although they do not necessarily all occur together.

== Distribution ==
It occurs in southern, western and eastern Goiás, western Minas Gerais and northeastern Mato Grosso do Sul, three inland states of southern central Brazil. Up until 2018, many publications state that this species is endemic to southwestern Goiás, but it was collected in Minas Gerais already in 1987, and as of 2018, with further sampling of the flora, its known range has expanded considerably. In 1998 the IUCN reported that a single, but large and quite healthy population occurred near Jataí, largely protected within the confines of a military reservation (41º BIMTZ), but as of 2017 it is known from at least fourteen localities. These are in the municipalities of Aparecida do Rio Doce, Cachoeira Alta, Caçu, Cavalcante, Jataí, Perolândia and Rio Verde in Goiás, and Ituiutaba and Patrocínio in the Triângulo Mineiro area of Minas Gerais. It is particularly prominent around the city of Jataí, with the palms growing at visibly high densities.

The total area of occupancy (AOO) was estimated to be only 3,762 km^{2} in 2012, but in 2017 the AOO was estimated to be 1,645 km^{2}, while the extent of occurrence (EOO) was estimated to be 10,100 km^{2}, which means that the species has an abundance of 16%, which is very low compared to the other species in the genus Butia.

== Ecology ==
=== Habitat ===
It grows in cerrado. In Cavalcante it occurs in cerrado plains sensu stricto, in places with well-drained soils and usually sparse tree cover. Densities of 880 to 1379 woody plants per hectare have been recorded for the palm grove areas, with a mean of 89 adult palms a hectare. Palm density is highest in areas with sparse woody vegetation. It often grows together with Syagrus flexuosa, Attalea and Allagoptera palms.

The soils it grows in are well-draining oxisols which are dark red or purple near the larger watercourses.

=== Reproduction ===
Plants may flower at a very young age. From year to year the flowering can be erratic, with some years having few trees flowering. According to Pablo Viany Prieto in his report for the Centro Nacional de Conservação da Flora it fruits throughout the year, and according to Martins in her doctoral thesis it has been collected flowering in November and fruiting in February, August and November.

The plants have protandrous dichogamy, this is because the male flowers, located at the end of the rachillae flower first, with the female flowers in the centre of the inflorescence flowering after the male ones senesce, thus promoting outcrossing. Female floral anthesis shows no correlation with climate, although significant differences exist between sites.

Fruiting begins in June with immature fruit, with fruiting occurring during the cool, dry season. Usually, several immature fruits are aborted and dropped before maturation. Maturation occurs in August, and the fruit can remain on the infructescence until dispersion from September to January. In a natural population, approximately 30% to 50% of the individuals bear ripe fruit, although many more bore infructescences with immature fruit.

The age structure of the extant population shows a pattern of periods of high germination success alternated with longer periods of low fecundity.

=== Interspecies relationships ===
Hemi-epiphytic figs may grow on the trunks.

== Uses ==
In its native palm groves near Jataí the fruit is harvested and gathered from the wild, commonly for use to make locally consumed juices. A liquor is also made from them in some areas by soaking the fruit in spirits or white rum.

The leaves are harvested for use in making brooms, in many areas likely beyond sustainable levels. Leaves are only harvested from mature specimens with trunks.

Among the Kalunga of the village of Engenho II in Cavalcante, Goiás, one person has used the leaves as incense in semi-Catholic rituals.

=== Horticulture ===
It can be used as an ornamental. Seeds have been commercially available from speciality vendors since at least 2004. In Brazil, fully grown specimens are available from nurseries. It is advised to plant the palms in full sunlight. Plants are very slow growing. They are drought and wind resistant. It is likely not hardy. It is said to take 0 °C, but should be protected at 10 °C in the Netherlands. Kembrey claims it can take −6 °C and that the USDA hardiness zone is 9b.

== Conservation ==
Noblick, writing for the IUCN in 1998, mentioned high seed predation by 'bean weevils' as a possible threat to the species, and due to this and its limited range classified it as 'vulnerable'.

In 2012 the Centro Nacional de Conservação da Flora rated the conservation status for Brazil as 'endangered', primarily due to an already restricted distribution and habitat loss due to the many decades of ongoing mining and the pressure of agricultural expansion, as well as the gathering of fruit by local people and tourists, and a high juvenile mortality (see ecology section above).

In a 2017 dissertation by Marcelo Piske Eslabão he advocates considering the species as 'critically endangered' as the IUCN categories B1ab(i, ii, iii) and B2ab(i, ii, iii) applied, although Eslabão does not adequately explain which criteria exactly applies, as some clearly do not (B1 (EOO (see distribution section above) below 100 km^{2}) and B2 (AOO below 10 km^{2}). This would likely mean that the population was estimated to have declined by 90% or more within 10 years or 3 generations, in which a number of other qualifications might apply, such as an observed decrease in quality of habitat, and/or estimated AOO or EOO. Eslabão elaborates that intense overexploitation of the leaves for broom construction is causing very apparent alterations and excessive mortality in many populations. Martins also relates how the continual leaf extraction results in reduced plant size and an altered look to the palms. Studies by Guilherme et al. illustrate how continued leaf extraction can result in a significantly lower proportion of the palms flowering and thus reproducing, and much later fruit maturation, and that leaf production in populations under high leaf extraction pressure is reduced.

Much of the region in which it grows has been converted to use for agricultural activities such as cattle, corn, soybean and increasingly sugar cane. The palm groves also show ecological disturbances in the form of infestation by invasive grasses and fires.

A portion of the population is protected within the confines of a military reservation (41º BIMTZ), although it does not occur in any official conservation areas.
