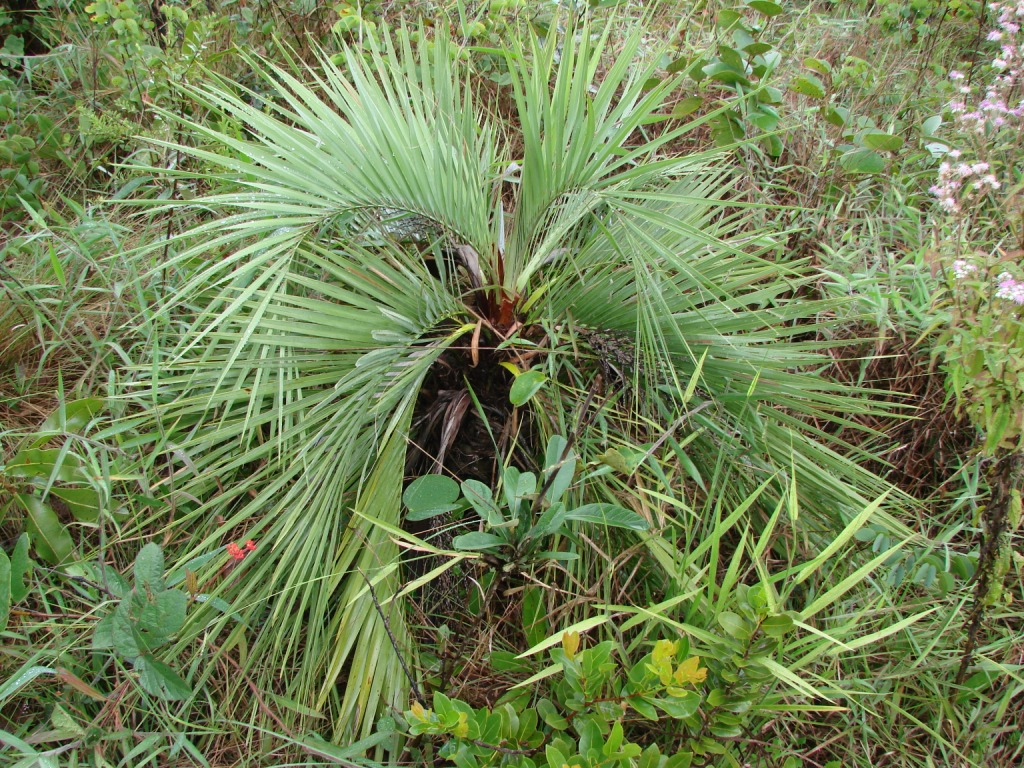
- Butia archeri var. archeri in Parque Olhos D'Água, Federal District, Brazil

Scientific classification
- Kingdom: Plantae
- Clade: Tracheophytes
- Clade: Angiosperms
- Clade: Monocots
- Clade: Commelinids
- Order: Arecales
- Family: Arecaceae
- Genus: Butia
- Species: B. archeri

Binomial name
- Butia archeri (Glassman) Glassman [1979]

Synonyms
- Syagrus archeri Glassman [1967]

= Butia archeri =

Species of palm

Butia archeri is a small species of Butia palm with a short trunk native to the states of Goiás, Brasília, Minas Gerais and São Paulo in Brazil.

It has been given the common name dwarf jelly palm in English. Local common names which have been recorded for this species are coqueirinho-do-campo, butiazinho and vassourinha.

== Taxonomy ==
Sidney Fredrick Glassman first described this species in 1967 from a specimen collected by William Andrew Archer (no. 4048) in Minas Gerais. Glassman named the new species after the collector. Initially he considered it a type of Syagrus, because it had unarmed petioles.

Among the many characters Odoardo Beccari used to distinguish the genus Butia from Syagrus in 1916, Glassman considered the most important to be the three seeds or locules in fruit, the presence of spines along the margins of the petiole, and the smooth rather than plicate spathes. Because Glassman had classified Butia archeri as a Syagrus, and this new taxon had smooth spathes and fruit with up to three seeds (along with a few other rare taxa at the time classified as Syagrus but at present Butia), he decided the genus Butia was indistinguishable from Syagrus, and in 1970 moved all Butia species to Syagrus.

In 1979 Glassman changed his mind after looking at the anatomy of the cross-section of the pinnae (leaflets) and reclassified it as a Butia.

== Infraspecific diversity ==
- Butia archeri var. archeri - Native to Goiás, Brasília, Minas Gerais. Glaucous leaves.
- Butia archeri var. diamantinensis K. Soares [2015] - Native to the area around the town of Diamantina, Minas Gerais. Green leaves, wide pinnae clustered close together on the rachis, a leaf forming an almost spherical canopy.

== Description ==
This is a solitary-trunked palm, with the trunk usually growing to maximally 1.3m in height and 10-21cm in diameter. It may be acaulescent sometimes, which means the trunk is very short and hidden underground. The 5 to 20 leaves are highly recurved. The leaf has a 5-18cm sheathing leaf base, an unarmed petiole 2-15cm long, a rachis 50–80cm long, and possessing 26-44 pinnae. The leaves are coloured glaucous (greyish) or green, depending on the variety. The pinnae are 25-40cm long and 1.3-2cm wide. The pinnae are inserted at a single plane on both sides of the rachis, such that a pair of pinnae form a 'V'-shape. In the nominate form the pinnae are arranged regularly down the length of the entire rachis. The developing inflorescence is protected in a woody spathe 30–80cm in length; the outside of the spathe is hairless and rarely somewhat scaly (lepidote or squamulate) and the swollen part of the spathe is 30-39cm long and 1.3-8cm wide. The inflorescence is branched to a single order, with 15-35 rachillae (branches) 7-20cm long. It is monoecious. The flowers are generally purplish. The staminate (male) flowers are 8-10mm long. The pistillate (female) flowers are 5–8mm in length. The shape of the 1.6-2cm x 1.5-1.7cm fruit is an elongated ellipsoid, yellowish-green to purplish-green in colour at maturity, and with yellow flesh which tastes sweet and sour. The 1-1.2cm x 0.9-1.1cm nut has an ovoid shape containing 1-3 seeds.

=== Similar species ===
According to Glassman in 1979, this taxon can easily be distinguished from other acaulescent species of Butia, such as B. arenicola and (sometimes) B. paraguayensis, by its petiole margins lacking teeth, and from B. microspadix, which also lacks teeth, by the hairless spathes, which are covered in dark brown hairs in B. microspadix.

== Distribution ==
It is endemic to Brazil, being native to the states of Goiás, Brasília, Minas Gerais and São Paulo in Brazil. The population is largely split in three large populations from east to west in regions of higher elevations, split by regions of lower elevations in the major river valleys. The spatial distribution of individuals is usually as small groups clustered together; one rarely encounters lone individuals.

== Habitat ==
It grows in rocky fields in highlands, in the cerrado ecoregion, where it can locally be very abundant.

== Ecology ==
In its native habitat it flowers from May to December and fruits from July to February.

It is found in 50cm high grasses together with the palm species Syagrus comosa, S. flexuosa, S. petraea, Allagoptera campestris (somewhat rarely), and A. leucocalyx in Fazenda Água Limpa in the Federal District. This area has an elevation of 1,100m and an annual rainfall of 1,600mm, a dry season in the winter from July to September, in latosol soil with a relatively high amount of aluminium oxides.

The seeds are usually preyed upon by insects and small rodents.

== Horticulture ==
Seeds germinate with difficulty (48% abortion rate according to a 2009 study). It grows quite slowly. It tolerates transplantation very well, even when an adult. It is advised to plant the palms in full sunlight. It is said to take −5 °C, but should be protected at 0 °C in the Netherlands. The USDA hardiness zone is 9a, according to a nursery.

By 2011 it was grown by Harri Lorenzi, a senior Brazilian botanist specialised in palms, in his Plantarum institute.

== Conservation ==
In 2004 the Secretaria de Estado do Meio Ambiente of the state of São Paulo rated the species as 'Vulnerable' (SMA no. 48, 2004). In 2012 the conservation status was evaluated as 'least concern' by the Centro Nacional de Conservação da Flora in Brazil.
