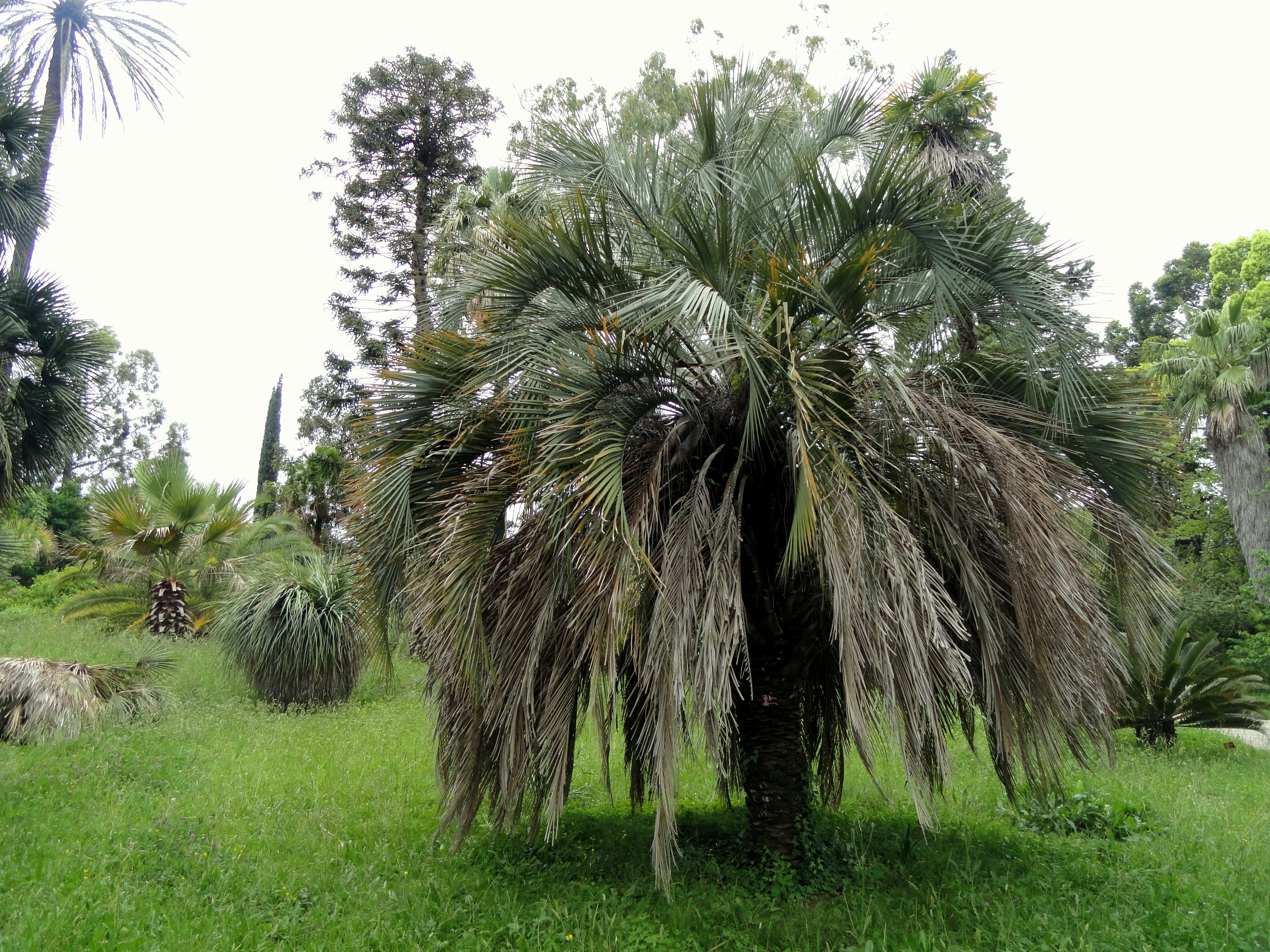
- Butia odorata

Scientific classification
- Kingdom: Plantae
- Clade: Embryophytes
- Clade: Tracheophytes
- Clade: Spermatophytes
- Clade: Angiosperms
- Clade: Monocots
- Clade: Commelinids
- Order: Arecales
- Family: Arecaceae
- Subfamily: Arecoideae
- Tribe: Cocoseae
- Subtribe: Attaleinae
- Genus: Butia (Becc.) Becc.

Type species
- Butia capitata (Mart.) Becc.

= Butia =

Genus of palms

Butia is a genus of palms in the family Arecaceae, native to the South American countries of Brazil, Paraguay, Uruguay and Argentina. Many species produce edible fruits, which are sometimes used to make alcoholic beverages and other foods. The name is derived from a Brazilian vernacular word for members of the genus.

== Description ==
These are 'feather palms', having pinnate leaves up to 3m long including petiole which usually have a distinct downward arch. The species vary from nearly stemless plants rarely exceeding 40 cm tall (e.g. Butia campicola) to small trees up to 12m tall (e.g. B. yatay).

Butia odorata is notable as one of the hardiest feather palms, tolerating temperatures down to about −10 °C; it is widely cultivated in warm temperate to subtropical regions.

== Species ==
Accepted species:

Image	Scientific name	Distribution
	Butia archeri (Glassman) Glassman	Goiás, Brasília, Minas Gerais, São Paulo
	Butia arenicola (Barb.Rodr.) Burret	Mato Grosso do Sul, Paraguay
	Butia campicola (Barb.Rodr.) Noblick	Mato Grosso do Sul, Paraguay
	Butia capitata (Mart.) Becc.	Minas Gerais, Goiás, Bahia
	Butia catarinensis Noblick & Lorenzi	Rio Grande do Sul, Santa Catarina
	Butia eriospatha (Mart. ex Drude) Becc. – Woolly butia palm	Paraná, Rio Grande do Sul, Santa Catarina
	Butia exilata Deble & Marchiori	Rio Grande do Sul
	Butia exospadix Noblick	Mato Grosso do Sul, Paraguay
	Butia lallemantii Deble & Marchiori	Rio Grande do Sul, Uruguay
	Butia lepidotispatha Noblick	Mato Grosso do Sul, Paraguay
	Butia leptospatha (Burret) Noblick	Mato Grosso do Sul, Paraguay
	Butia marmorii Noblick	Alto Paraná in Paraguay
	Butia matogrossensis Noblick & Lorenzi	Mato Grosso do Sul
	Butia microspadix Burret	Paraná, São Paulo
	Butia odorata (Barb.Rodr.) Noblick – South American jelly palm, jelly palm, pindo palm	Rio Grande do Sul, Uruguay
	Butia paraguayensis (Barb.Rodr.) L.H.Bailey – Dwarf yatay palm	Brazil, Argentina, Paraguay, Uruguay
	Butia pubispatha Noblick & Lorenzi	Paraná
	Butia purpurascens Glassman	Goiás, Minas Gerais
	Butia witeckii K.Soares & S. Longhi	Rio Grande do Sul
	Butia yatay (Mart.) Becc. – Jelly palm, yatay palm	Rio Grande do Sul, Uruguay, Argentina

No longer accepted species:

- Butia missionera Deble & Marchiori - Rio Grande do Sul
- Butia noblickii Deble - Corrientes Province of Argentina
- Butia quaraimana Deble & Marchiori - Rio Grande do Sul
- Butia stolonifera (Barb.Rodr.) Becc. - Uruguay

New species:

- Butia poni (Haum.) Burret - Misiones Province of Argentina
- Butia sp. nov. - Mato Grosso do Sul

=== Intergeneric hybrids ===
- × Butyagrus alegretensis K. Soares (B. lallemantii × Syagrus romanzoffiana)
- × Butyagrus nabonnandii (Prosch.) Vorster (B. odorata × S. romanzoffiana)
- x Butyagrus eriospatha N. Kembry (B. eriospatha x S. romanzoffiana 'Santa Catarina')
