= El Palmar National Park =

- IUCN category II (national park)
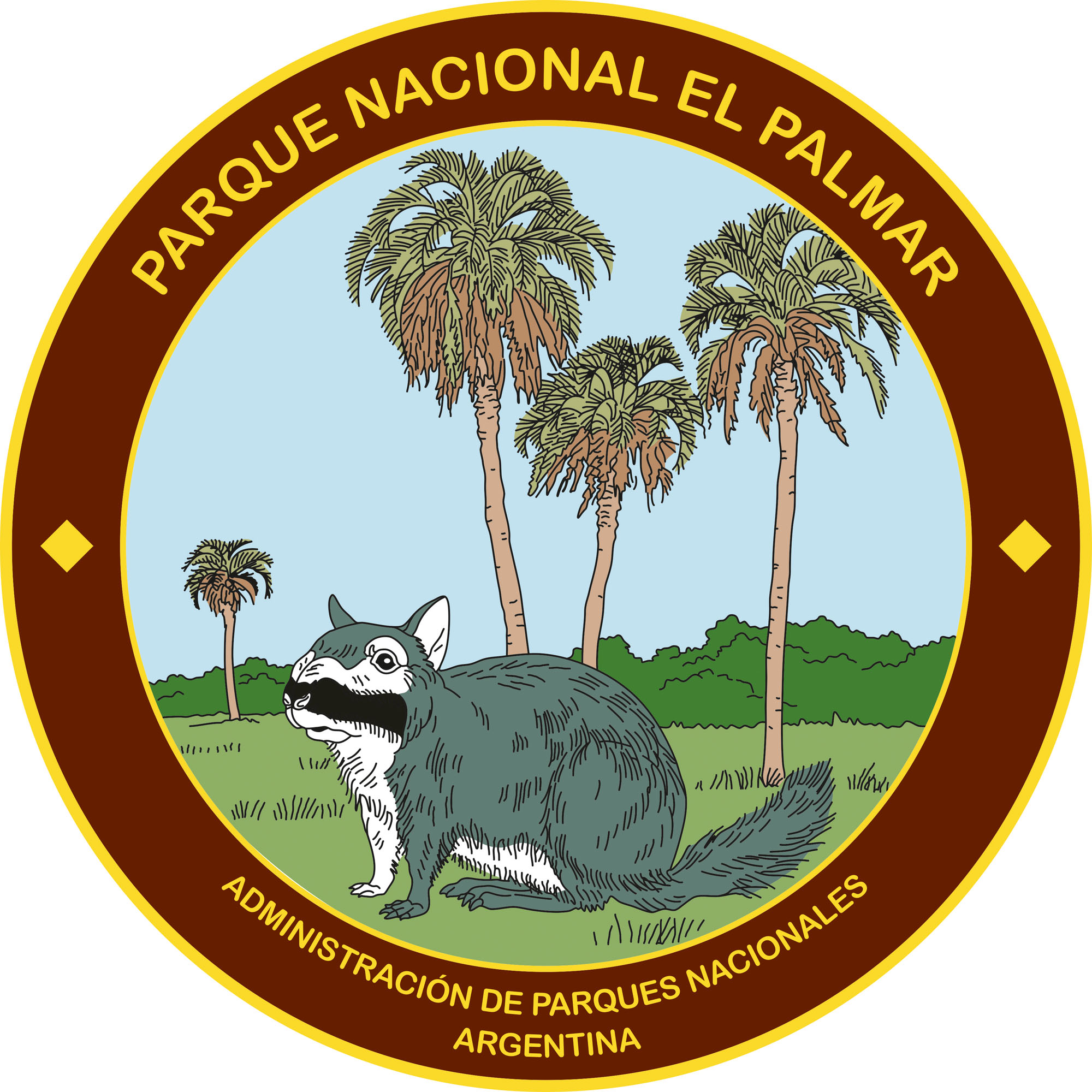
- Emblem of the El Palmar National Park

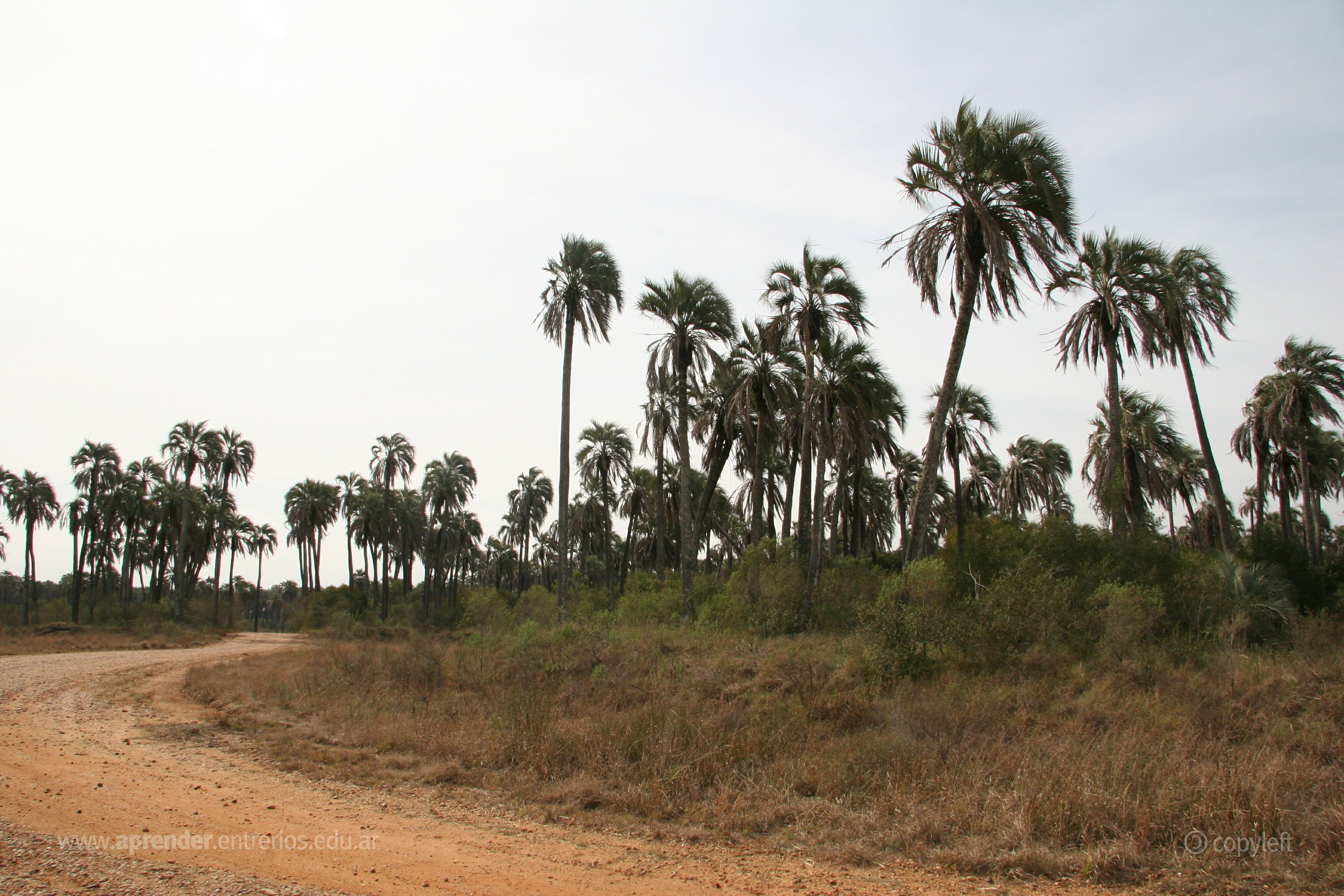

- Location within Argentina
- Location: Entre Ríos Province, Argentina
- Nearest city: Colón
- Coordinates: 31°51′11″S 58°19′21″W
- Area: 85 km^{2} (33 sq mi)
- Established: 1966
- Governing body: Administración de Parques Nacionales

Ramsar Wetland
- Official name: Palmar Yatay
- Designated: 6 May 2011
- Reference no.: 1969

El Palmar National Park (in Spanish, Parque Nacional El Palmar) is one of Argentina's national parks. It is located on the center-east of the province of Entre Ríos, midway between the cities of Colón (54 km) and Concordia (60 km). It has an area of about 85 km^{2} and was created in 1966 for the preservation of its characteristic yatay palm trees (Butia yatay, formerly Syagrus yatay).

The park has a temperate-humid savanna ecosystem, typical of the Argentine Mesopotamia. The terrain features patches of palm trees of several species, grassland, small woods and forest. All gets interrupted by streams flowing east into the Uruguay River. The local fauna includes woodpeckers, ñandús, foxes, viscachas and capybaras.

== Gallery ==
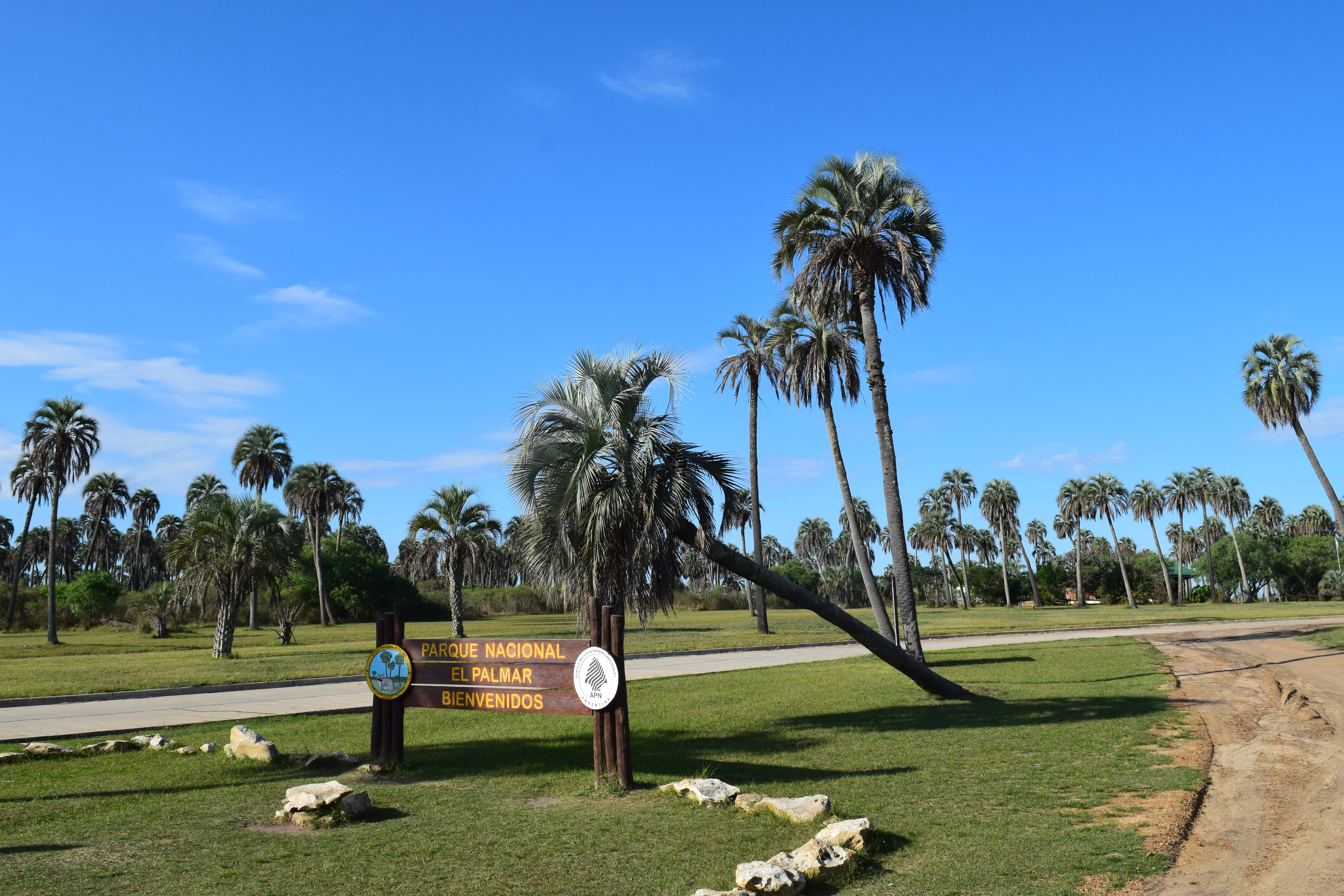
Entrance to the national park

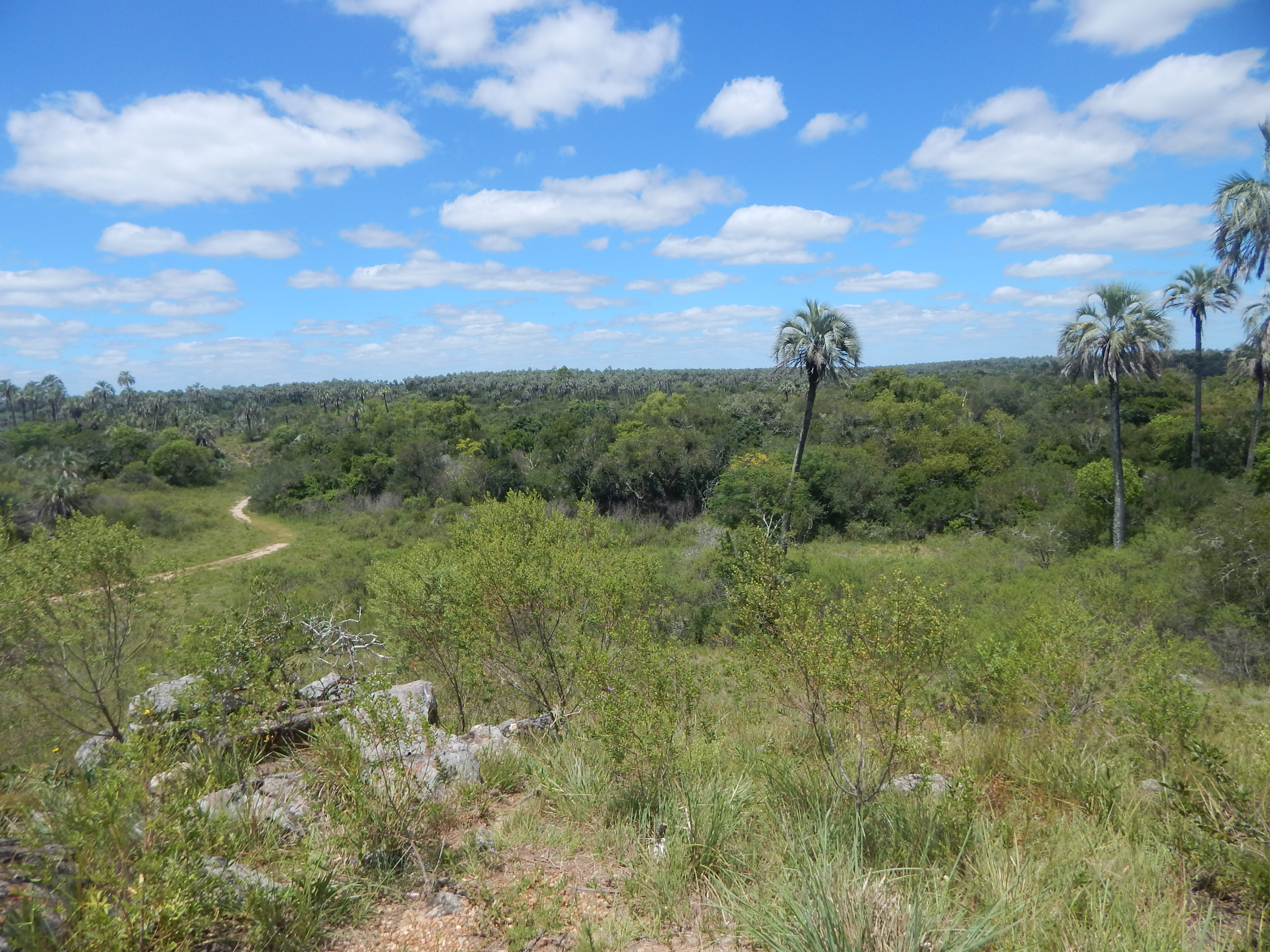
The jelly palm in the national park

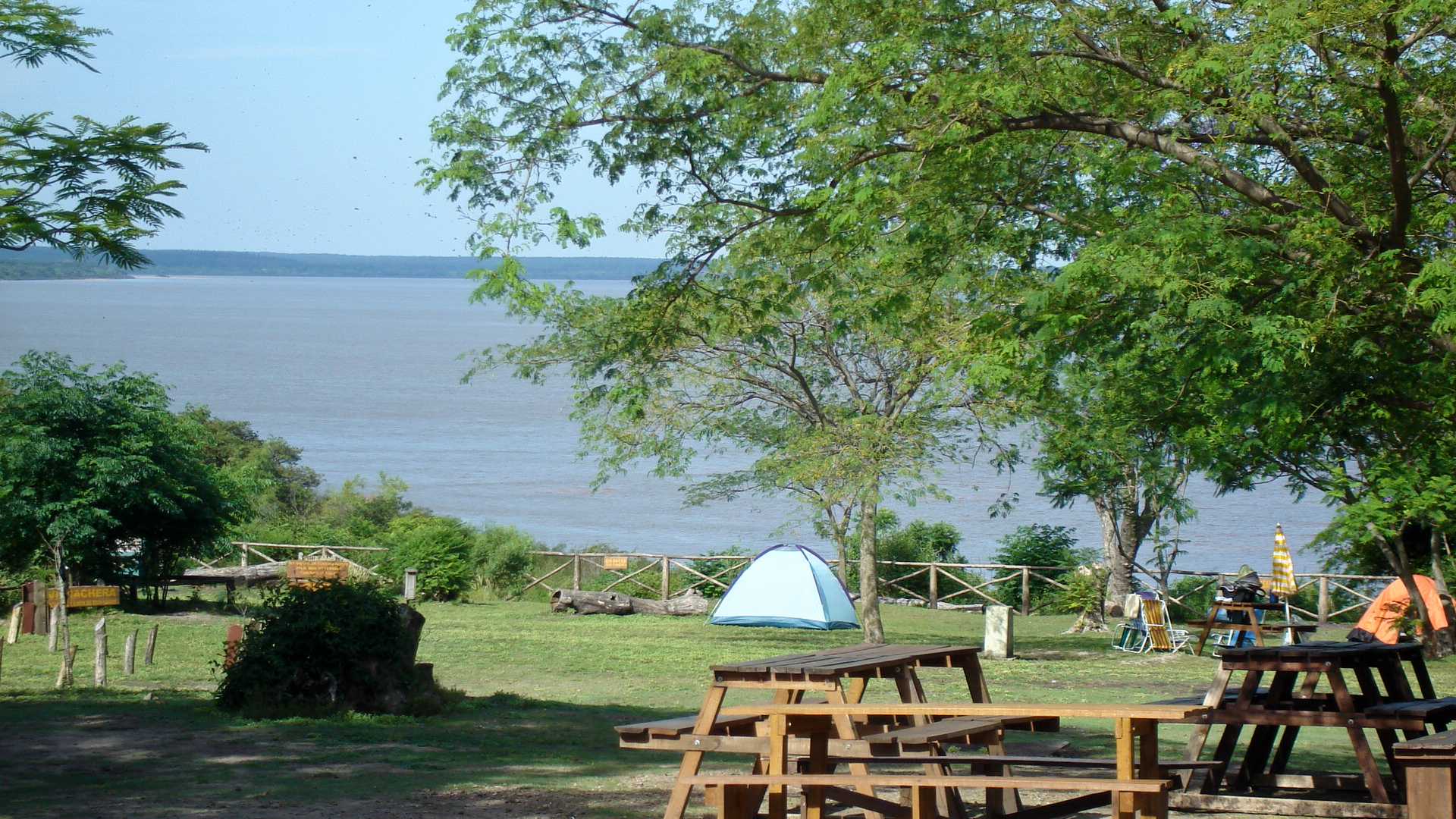
Camping tents next to the Uruguay River

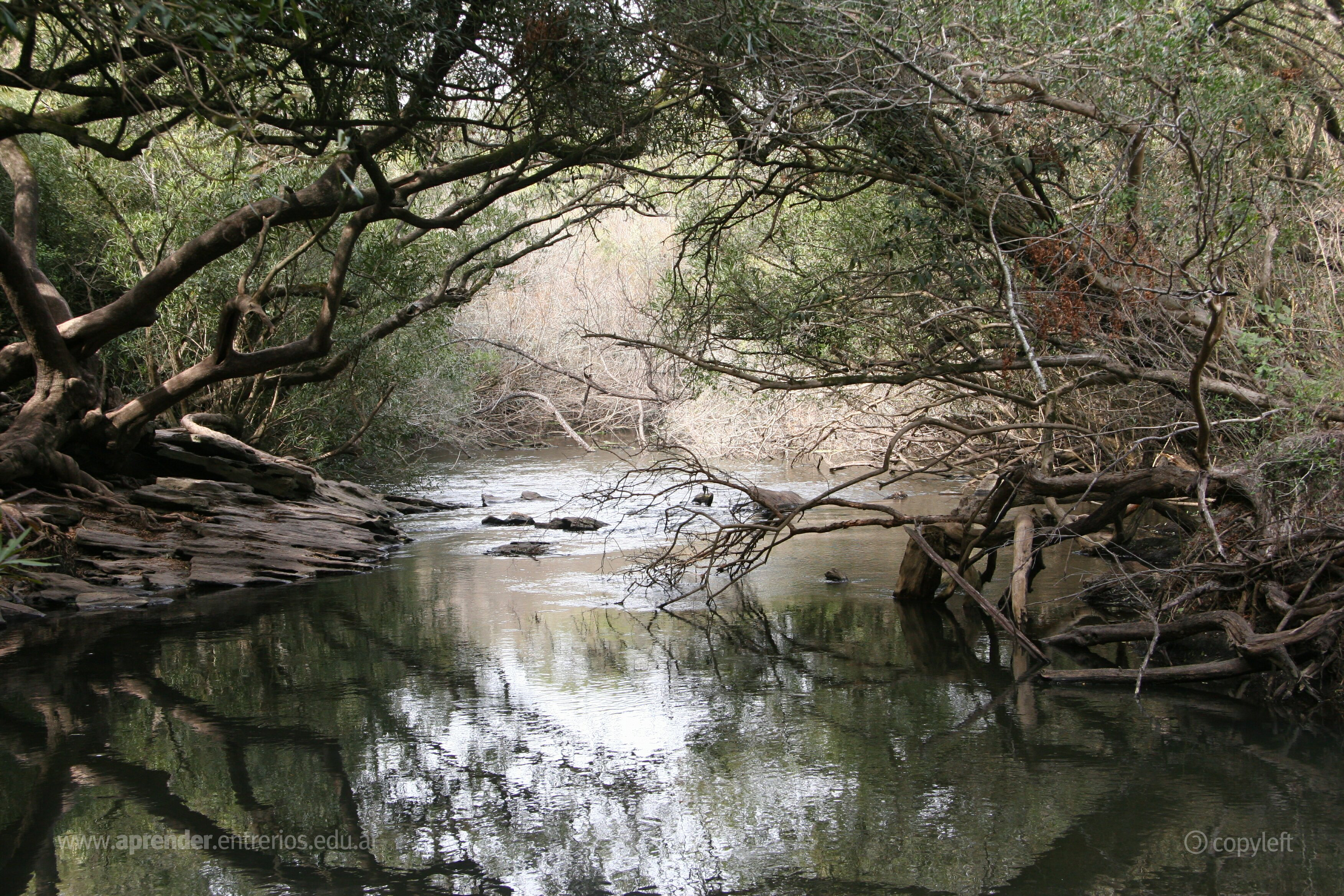
View of the park streams

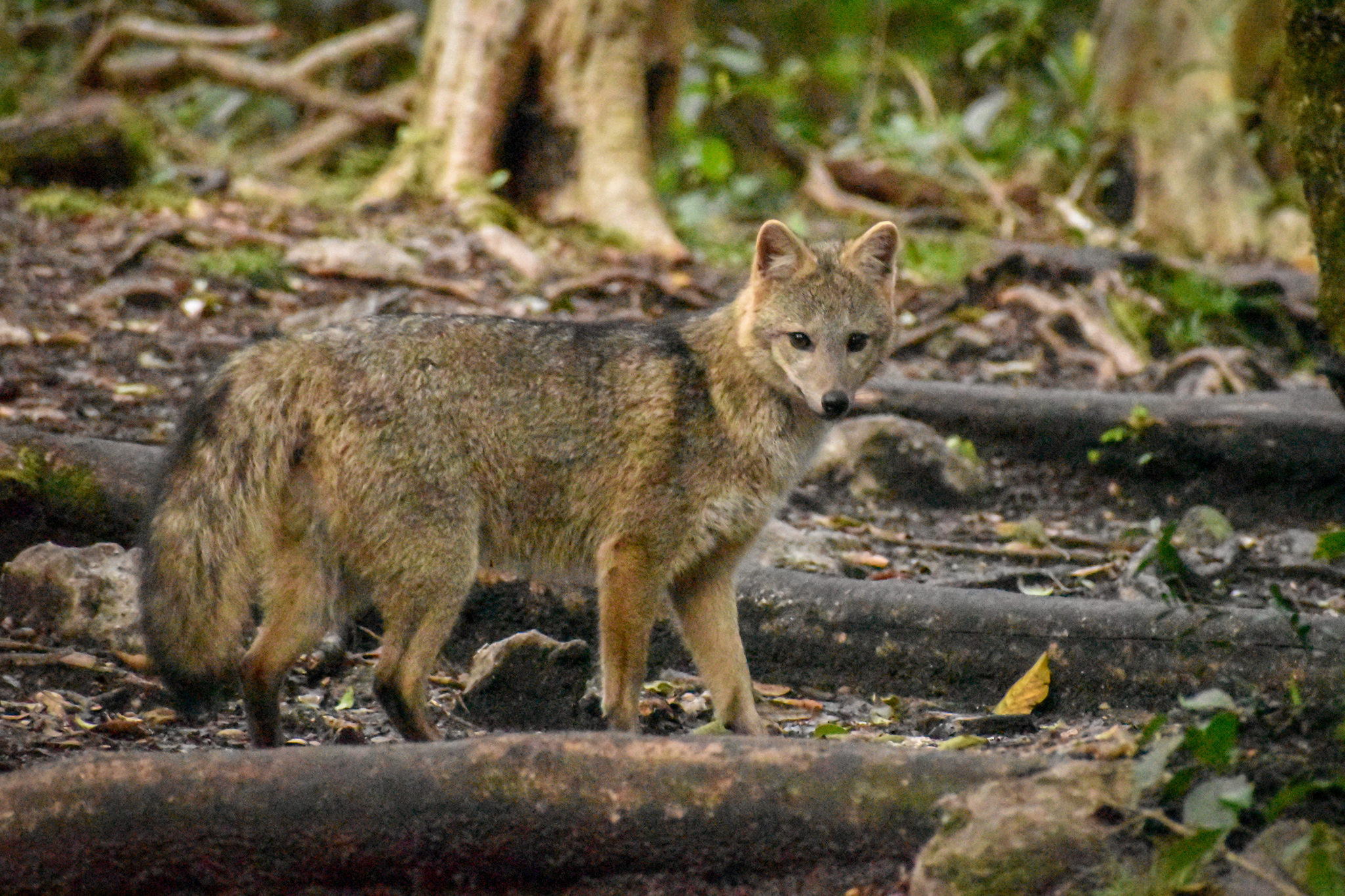
Crab-eating fox

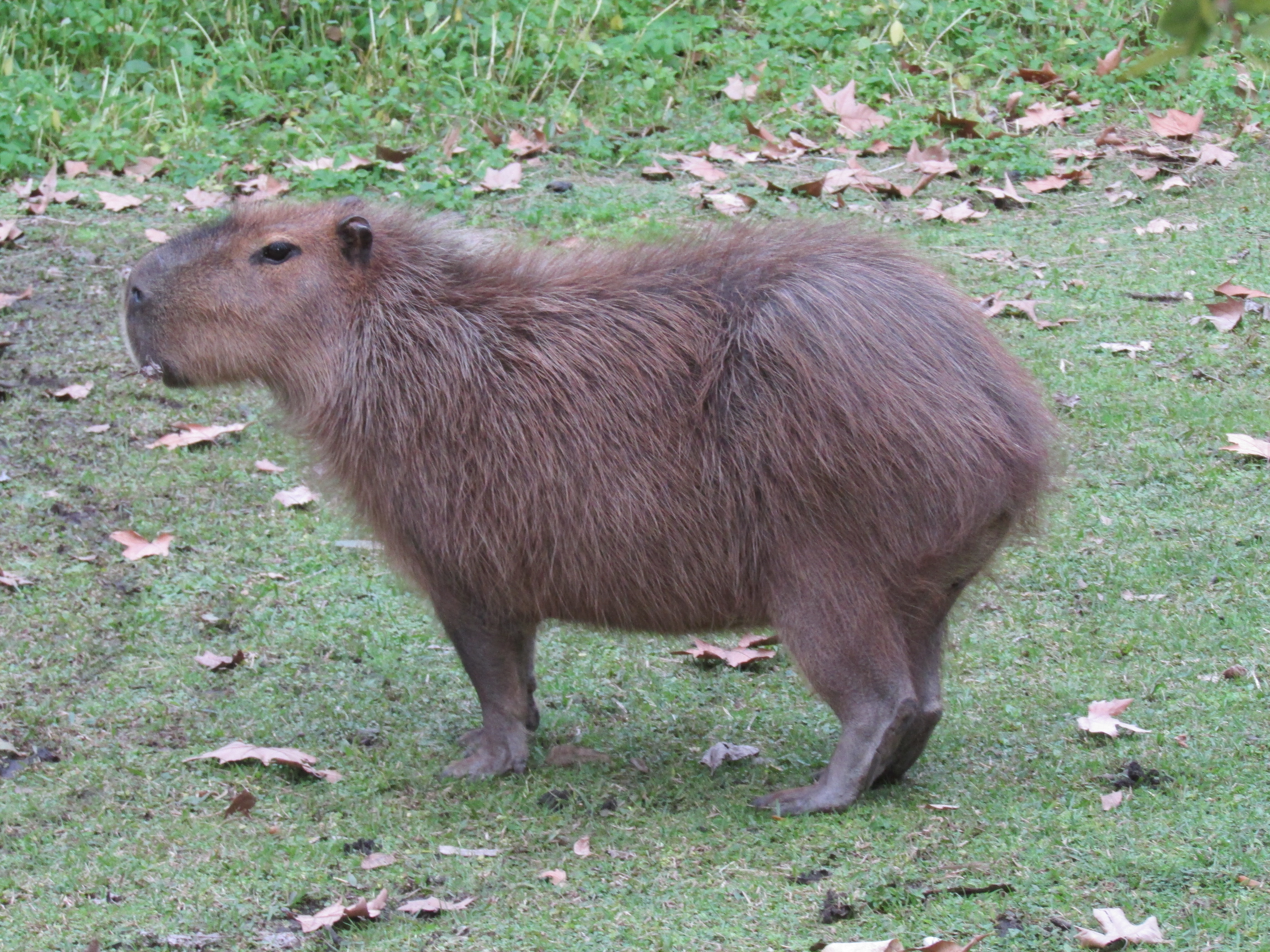
Capybara

== Sources ==
- El Palmar National Park (in Spanish)
- Site about El Palmar National Park (in Spanish)
- Park description (in Spanish)
- El Palmar Photographic Tour
