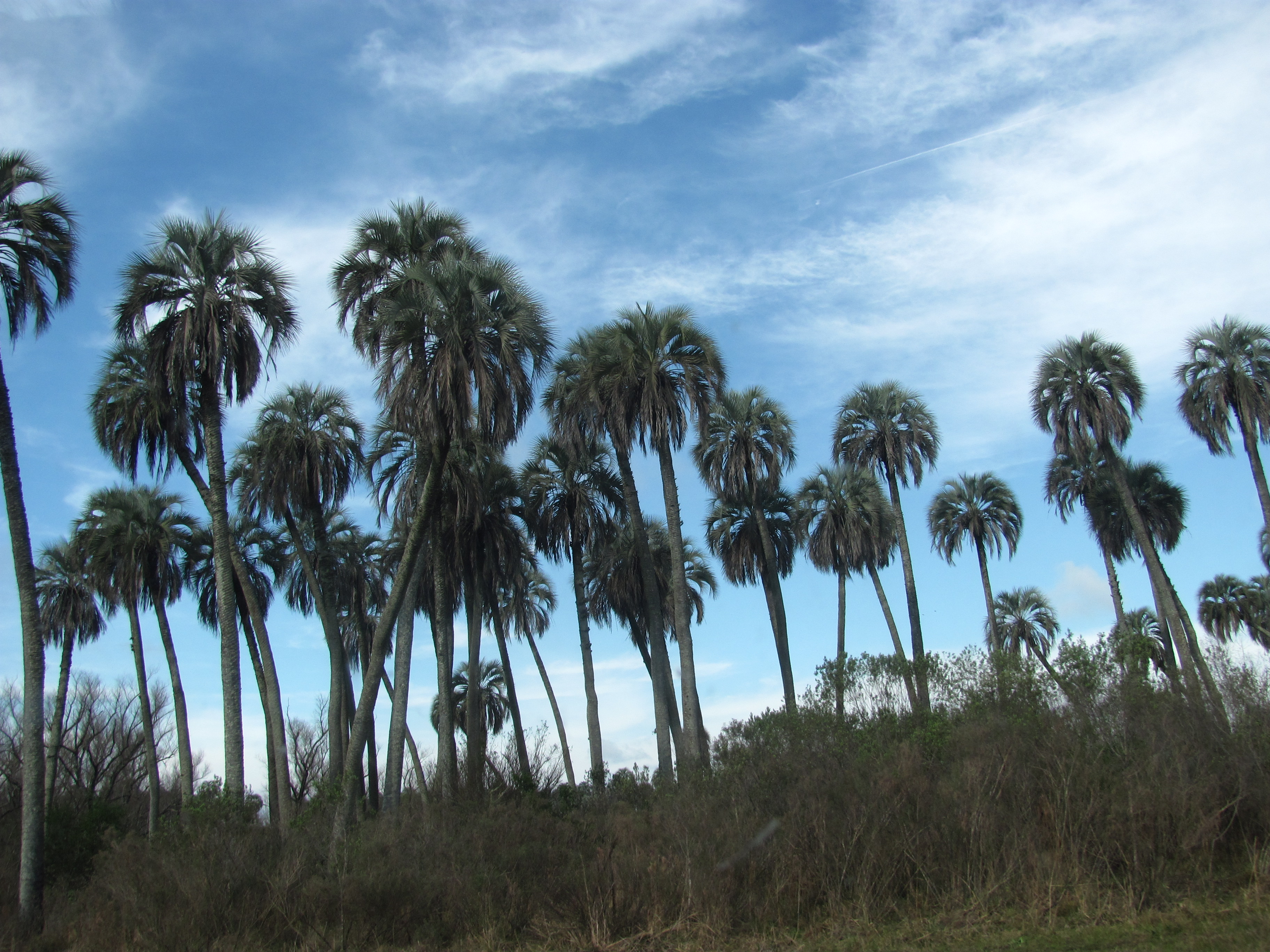
- Specimens of Butia yatay at El Palmar National Park, Entre Ríos, Argentina

Scientific classification
- Kingdom: Plantae
- Clade: Embryophytes
- Clade: Tracheophytes
- Clade: Spermatophytes
- Clade: Angiosperms
- Clade: Monocots
- Clade: Commelinids
- Order: Arecales
- Family: Arecaceae
- Genus: Butia
- Species: B. yatay

Binomial name
- Butia yatay (Mart.) Becc. [1916]

Synonyms
- Cocos yatay Mart. [1844]; Calappa yatay (Mart.) Kuntze [1891]; Syagrus yatay (Mart.) Glassman [1970]; Butia capitata subsp. yatay (Mart.) Herter [1940]; Butia missionera Deble & Marchiori [2011]; Butia quaraimana Deble & Marchiori [2012]

= Butia yatay =

Species of palm

Butia yatay, the jelly palm or yatay palm, is a Butia palm native to southern Brazil, Uruguay and northern Argentina. It is known as the butiá-jataí in Portuguese in the south of Brazil, as well as simply jataí or butiá. It is sometimes cultivated as an ornamental in Europe and the United States. It is the tallest of all the species in the genus Butia. The fruit is edible with a sweet flavour.

== Etymology ==
This is one of only a few plants in which the scientific name is completely derived from Native American languages. Butia is from a local Brazilian vernacular name likely derived from Old Tupi ᵐba atí, meaning 'thorny thing', which probably refers to the spines along the petiole margins of most species. The specific epithet yatay is adopted from the Guaraní language word for such palms, yata'i, which itself refers to the small, hard fruit.

== Taxonomy ==
In 1970 Sidney Fredrick Glassman moved this species, along with all other Butia, to Syagrus, but in 1979 he changed his mind and moved everything back.

A population of Butia palms growing in Paraguay known as B. dyerana was synonymised with this species by Glassman, but this population was reclassified as a synonym of B. paraguayensis by at least 1996, removing B. yatay from the flora of Paraguay.

B. poni (Hauman) Burret [1930] (syn. Cocos poni Hauman [1919], a nomen nudum) was considered a synonym of B. yatay (and B. paraguayensis, pro parte, fide Soares [2015]), but was recognised as a species in its own right in 2017 by Deble after he rediscovered a population of the species in Argentina and was able to confirm its distinctiveness.

The recent taxa B. missionera and B. quaraimana described by Deble & Marchiori from Rio Grande do Sul, Brazil, and B. noblickii described by Deble from a population of palms in Corrientes Province of Argentina, have all been synonymised with this species either by Soares et al. in 2014, or Soares in 2015.

== Description ==
This is a solitary-trunked palm; the trunk often grows at an incline and is from 3 to 16m, exceptionally 18m tall, although they usually grow shorter in Brazil (to 8m). The trunks grow from 30 to 55 cm in diameter, usually retaining a coat of old leaf bases which do not shed easily naturally and which remain persistent for many years.

=== Leaves ===
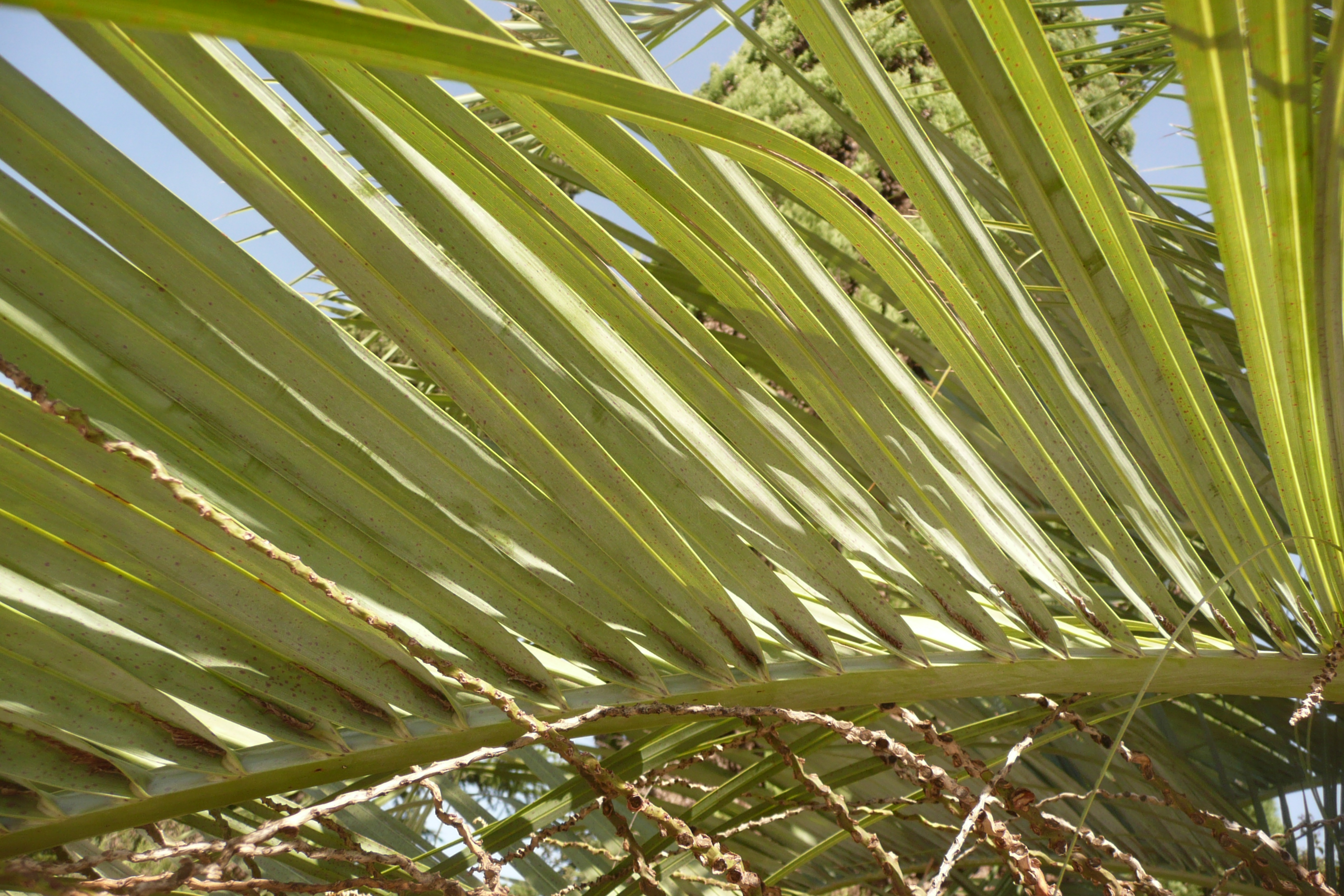
Leaves with pinnae arranged in a single plane per side of the leaf in Buenos Aires, Argentina.

There are 11 to 31 pinnate leaves arranged spirally around the crown of the trunk. The 40–130 cm long petiole of the leaf has margins armed in stiff teeth which may grow up to 4 cm in length, as well as fibres along the margins. The leaf has a rachis that is 163–200 cm in length. There are (57-)63-78 glaucous-coloured pinnae (leaflets) along this rachis, these pinnae are (58-)65–77 cm long and 2–3 cm wide in the middle of the leaf. The pinnae are inserted at a single plane on both sides of the rachis, such that each pair of pinnae form a 'V'-shape.

=== Inflorescence ===
The developing inflorescence is protected within a woody, hairless spathe which is lightly striated and 105–135 cm in total length, the swollen part of this spathe being 40–110 cm long and 7–14 cm wide. The branched inflorescence has a 40–75 cm long and 1.5-2.2 cm wide peduncle (stalk). The rachis of the inflorescence is 40–72 cm long and has 68-155 rachillae (branches) which are 16–72 cm long. The flowers are coloured yellow, yellow-purple, greenish-yellow or entirely purple. The staminate (male) flowers are 9-10mm in length; the pistillate (female) flowers 13–17(–18)mm.

Compared with other extant palms in the region, Butia yatay has the largest-sized pollen grains on average. They are bilaterally symmetrical, suboblate-shaped, the end piriform (pear-shaped), and monosulcate. The surface is covered in minute 2μm-large reticulate patterns.

=== Fruit & seeds ===
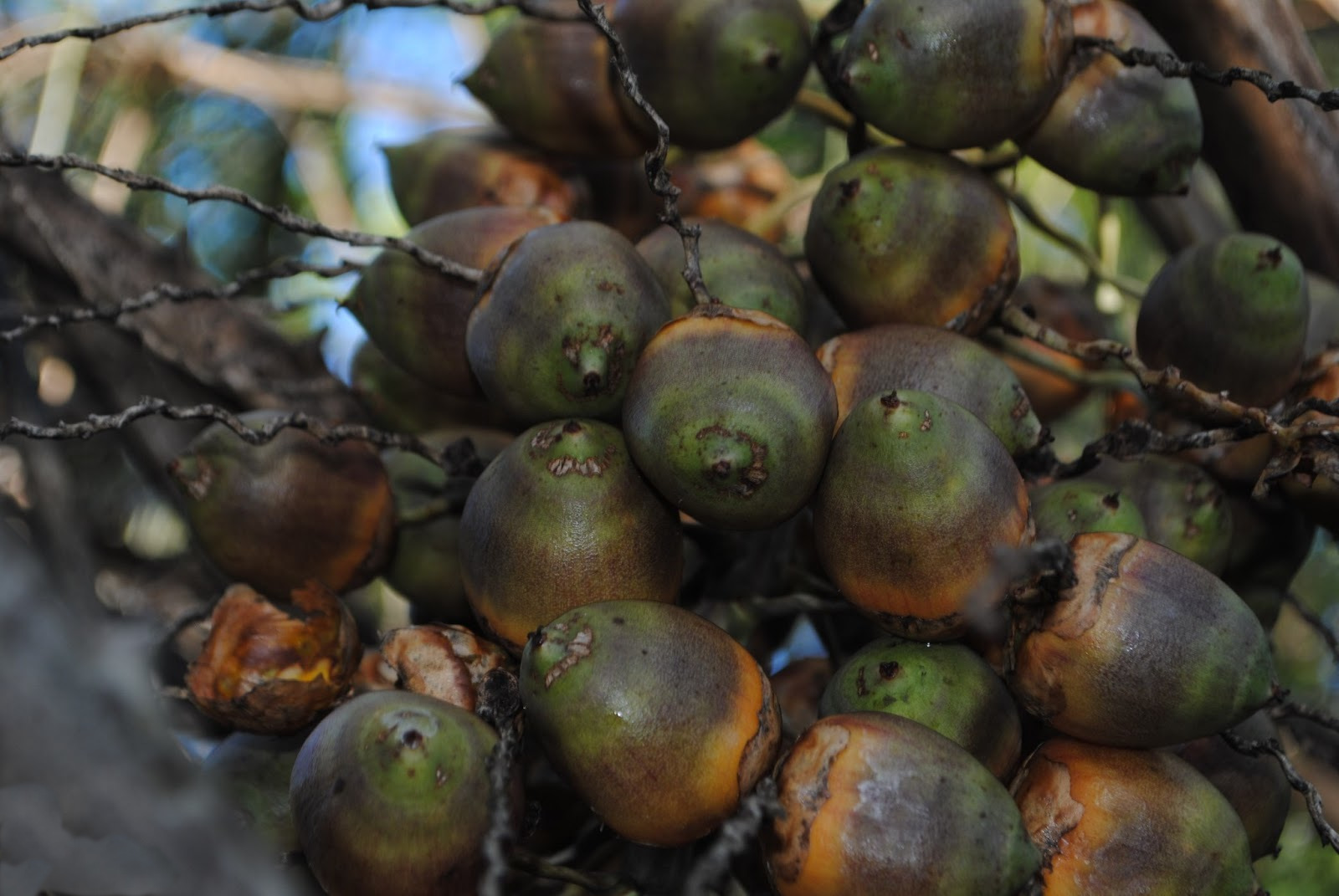
Butia yatay bearing almost ripe fruit along the banks of the Río Negro in the Cerro de la Palmera, Río Negro Department, Uruguay

The shape of the fruit is ovoid. The shape of the 1.8-2.8 by 1-1.7 cm nut is elongated, ellipsoid or turbinate, and it weighs 1.1-3.5g. The ripe fruit are 2.7–4.2 cm (1.1–1.7 in) by 1.5–3.8 cm (0.59–1.50 in) in size, weigh 8–23 g (0.28–0.81 oz), and have a persistent perianth. The fruit may be coloured yellow, orange, red, or purple, while the flesh is yellow, sweet, juicy, and slightly fibrous. The nut often has a beak or protuberance at its extremities, and has homogeneous endosperm and from 1 to 3 seeds.

=== Similar species ===
In his 1979 key to the genus Butia, Glassman compares this species with B. paraguayensis, the main differences being the taller trunk, the longer leaf rachis with more wider and longer pinnae, the spathe (being almost twice the size), and larger fruit, beyond the range of B. paraguayensis.

== Distribution ==
In Brazil it only occurs in the southernmost state of Rio Grande do Sul, and there only in the municipalities of Giruá and Quaraí. In Argentina it occurs in the northern-center provinces of Chaco, Corrientes, Entre Ríos, Misiones (in the municipalities of Candelaria and San Ignacio) and Santa Fe. In Uruguay it only occurs to the west in the departments of Paysandú and Río Negro.

Bauermann et al. investigated the possibility of using palm pollen, including this species, in palynology, in order to try to provide more detail about the ancient changes in habitat in the state Rio Grande do Sul in Brazil by tracking the changes in distribution and abundance of the palms, but were unable to provide much detail on the subject.

== Habitat and ecology ==
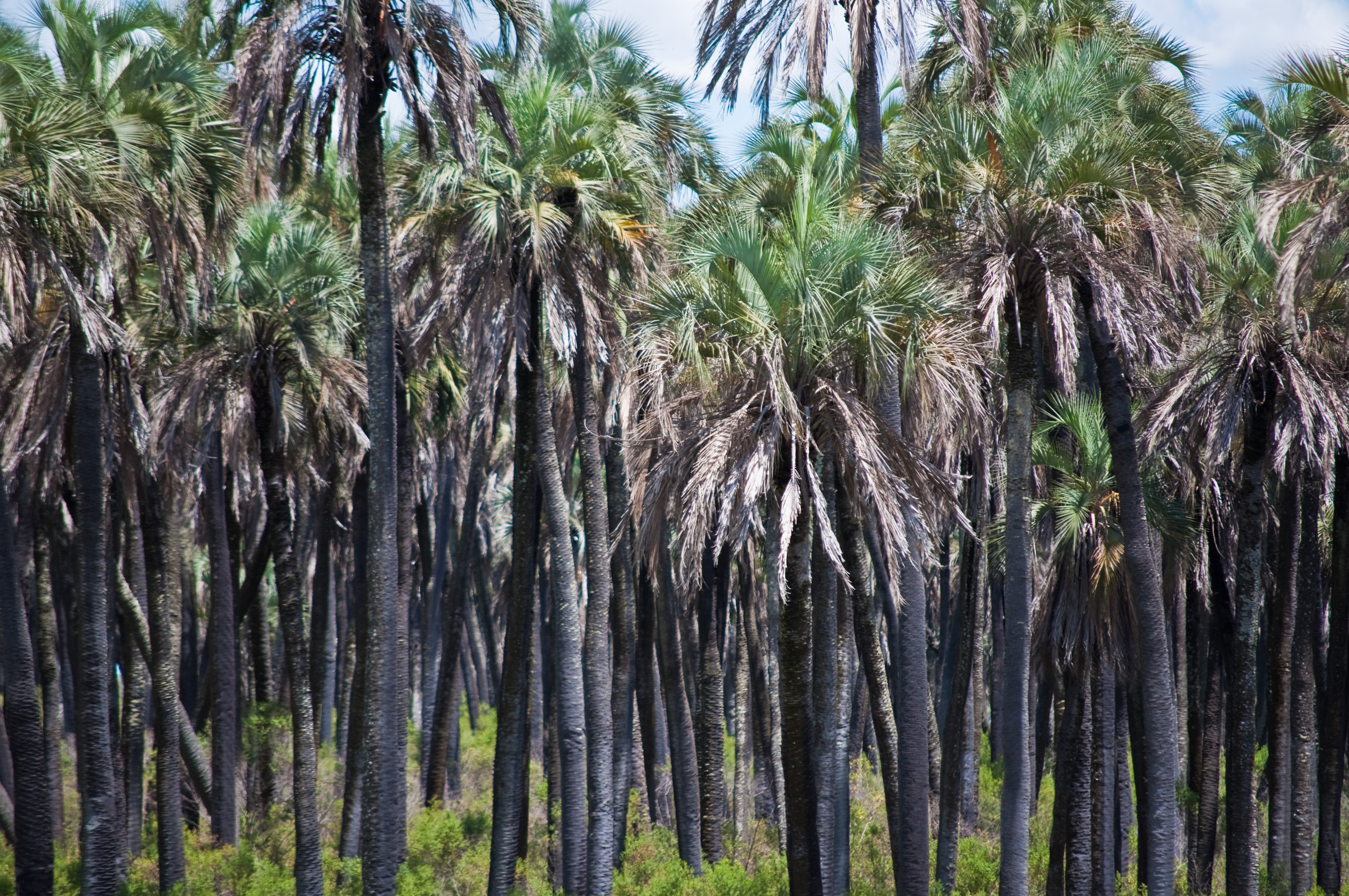
Palms growing in the wild in El Palmar, Entre Rios, Argentina.

This slow-growing palm grows to 12-18m tall, with a trunk diameter of 50 cm, in giant, ancient, almost monoculture groves in savannah habitats (called pampa(s) in Latin America). It is usually found in sandy soils, which are often much rockier than that in which other Butia are found. It grows at altitudes of 0-500m.

It fruits abundantly in the summer and the seeds germinate in the wild in the spring or the fall.

The nuts of this palm are alleged to have been the main diet of the glaucous macaw in 1993, although the taxonomy of local Butia populations has changed somewhat since then.

Butia yatay is thought to be one of the natural hosts for larvae (caterpillars) of the giant day-flying moth Paysandisia archon which attack the piths of this palm, along with many other palm species, at least in Europe where the moth has naturalised after likely being introduced from Argentina hidden in the trunks of B. yatay and Trithrinax campestris in consignments of palms imported for ornamental horticulture. An infestation can kill the palm. The moth prefers genera of palm with hairy trunks as the fibre is used in the construction of the cocoon for the pupa; in Europe it prefers Trachycarpus above all, but also Trithrinax or Chamaerops.

== Horticulture ==
Seeds (or rather, nuts) are collected in Brazil for the international ornamental plant industry.

It is advised to plant the palms in full sunlight. It is said to take −12 °C, but should be protected at −5 °C in the Netherlands.

It is commonly grown and sold in Japan as an ornamental lawn plant.

== Conservation ==
In 2008 the conservation status in Brazil was classified as 'data deficient' by the federal Ministério do Meio Ambiente. In 2012 the conservation status in Brazil was evaluated as 'vulnerable' by the Centro Nacional de Conservação da Flora. Although it occurs over an extensive range, both the size and quality of the remaining habitat is threatened due to the expansion of forestry and agricultural activities.

Specimens are cultivated ex situ in Brazil in the Botanical Garden of Rio de Janeiro and the Inhotim Botanical Garden.

== Gallery ==
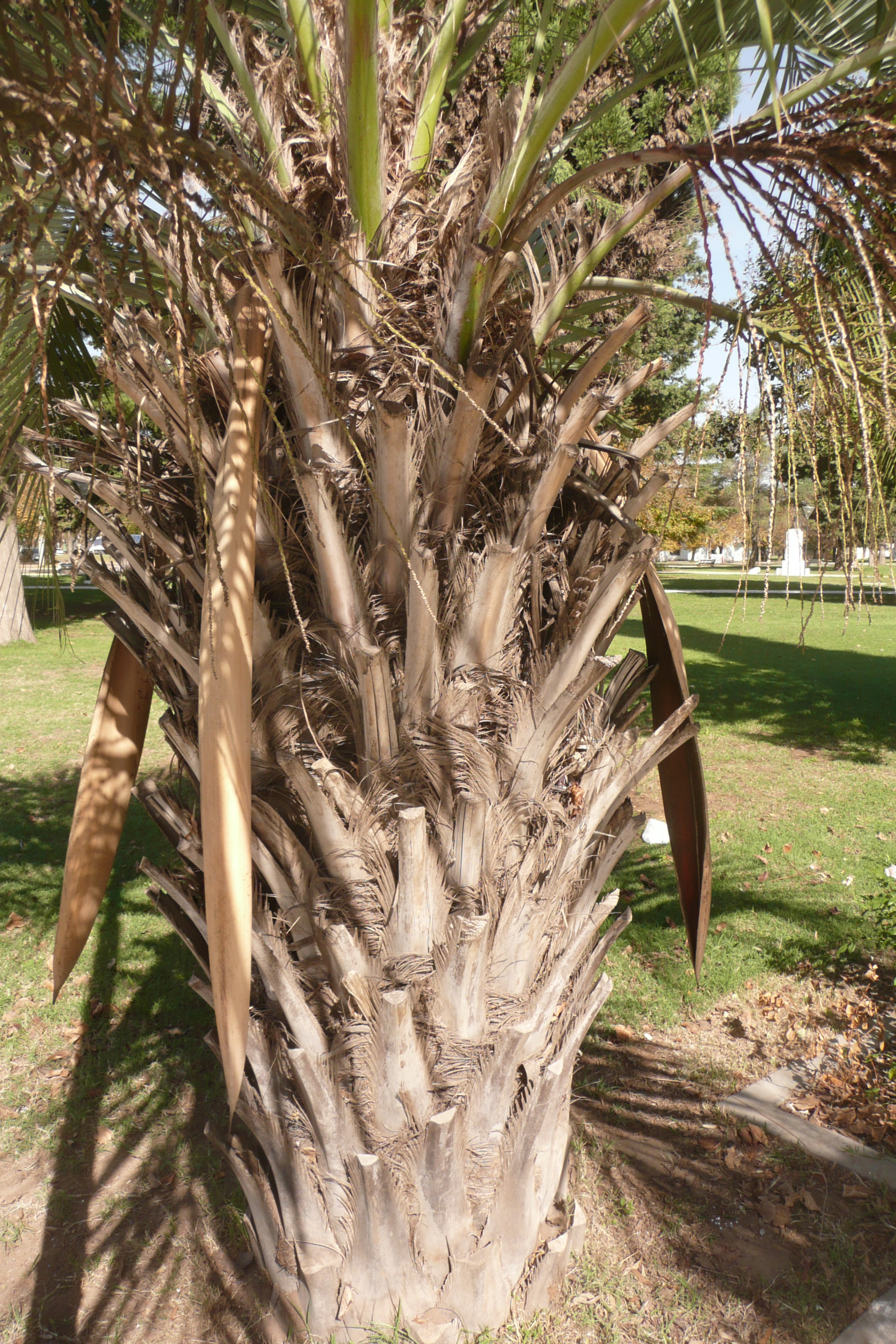
A cultivated younger tree in Fortín Olavarría, Buenos Aires, Argentina, showing the persistent leaf bases and the spathes.

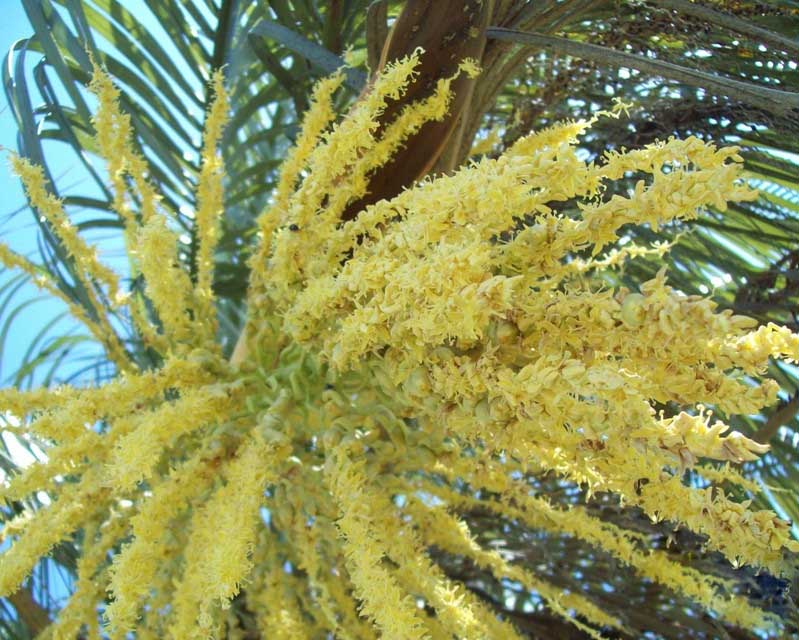
Flowers of Butia yatay in Quebracho, Paysandú Department, Uruguay.

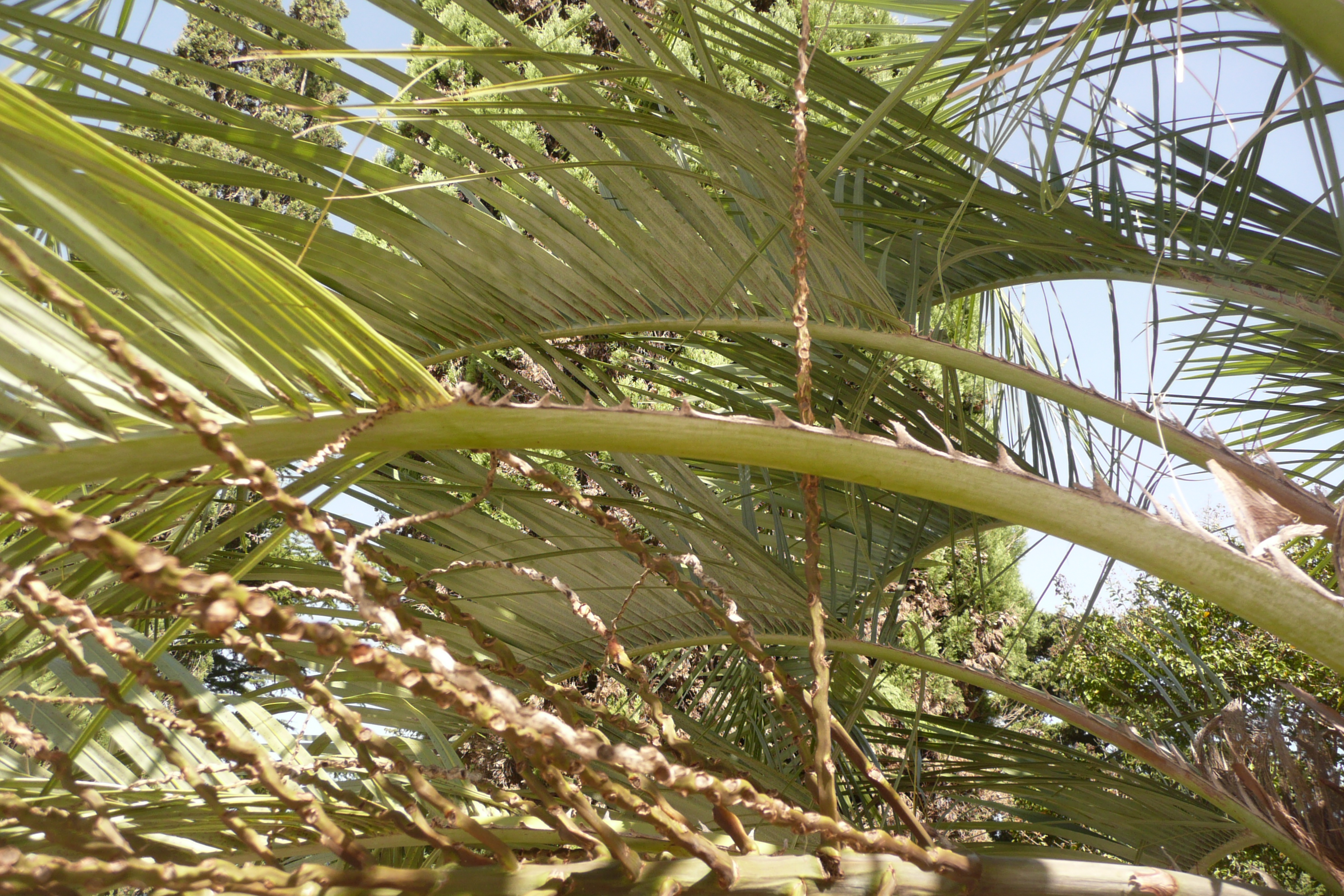
The petiole of the leaf bearing substantial teeth along its margins.

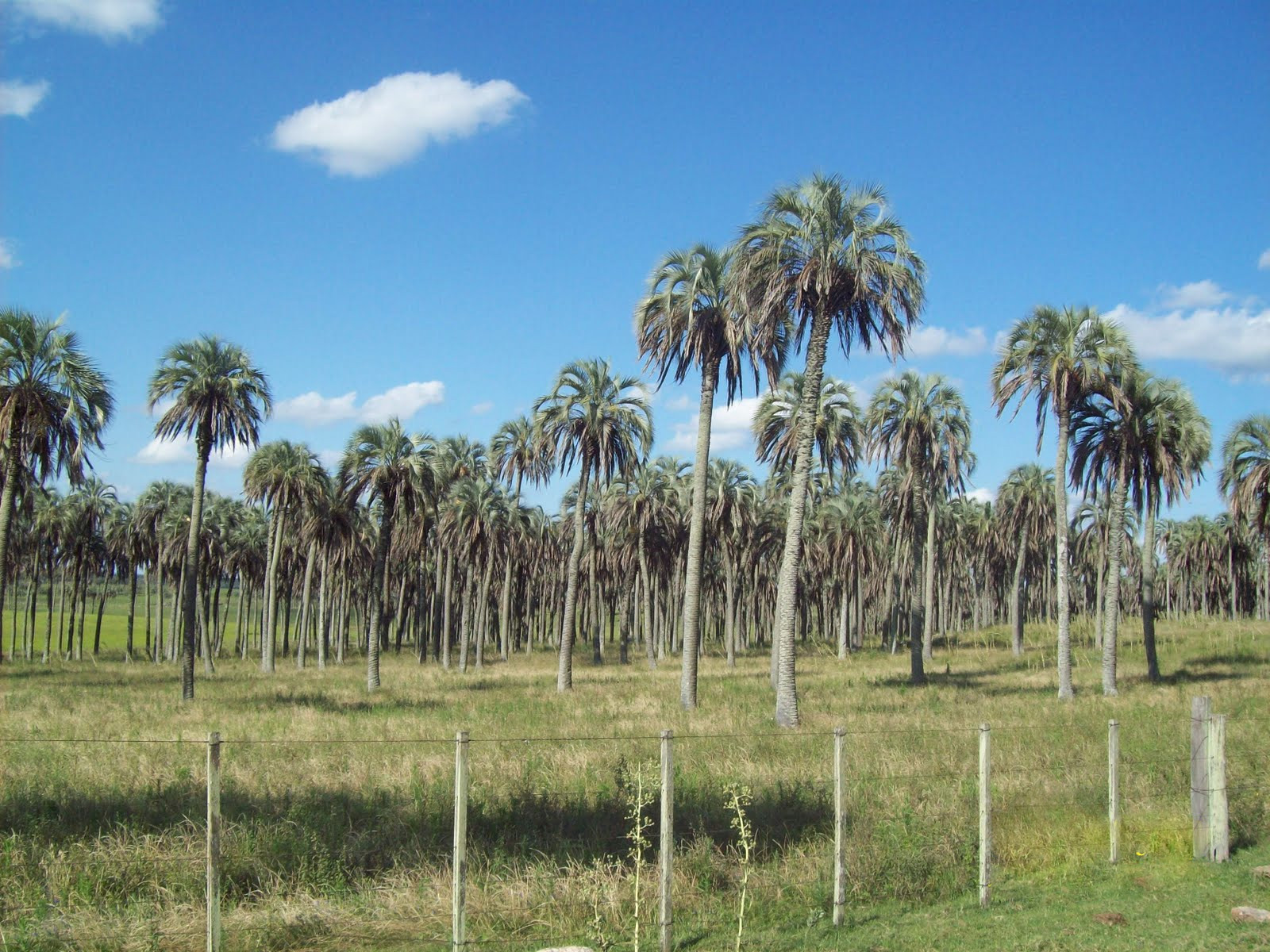
A grove of old trees in situ at Quebracho, Paysandú Department, Uruguay.

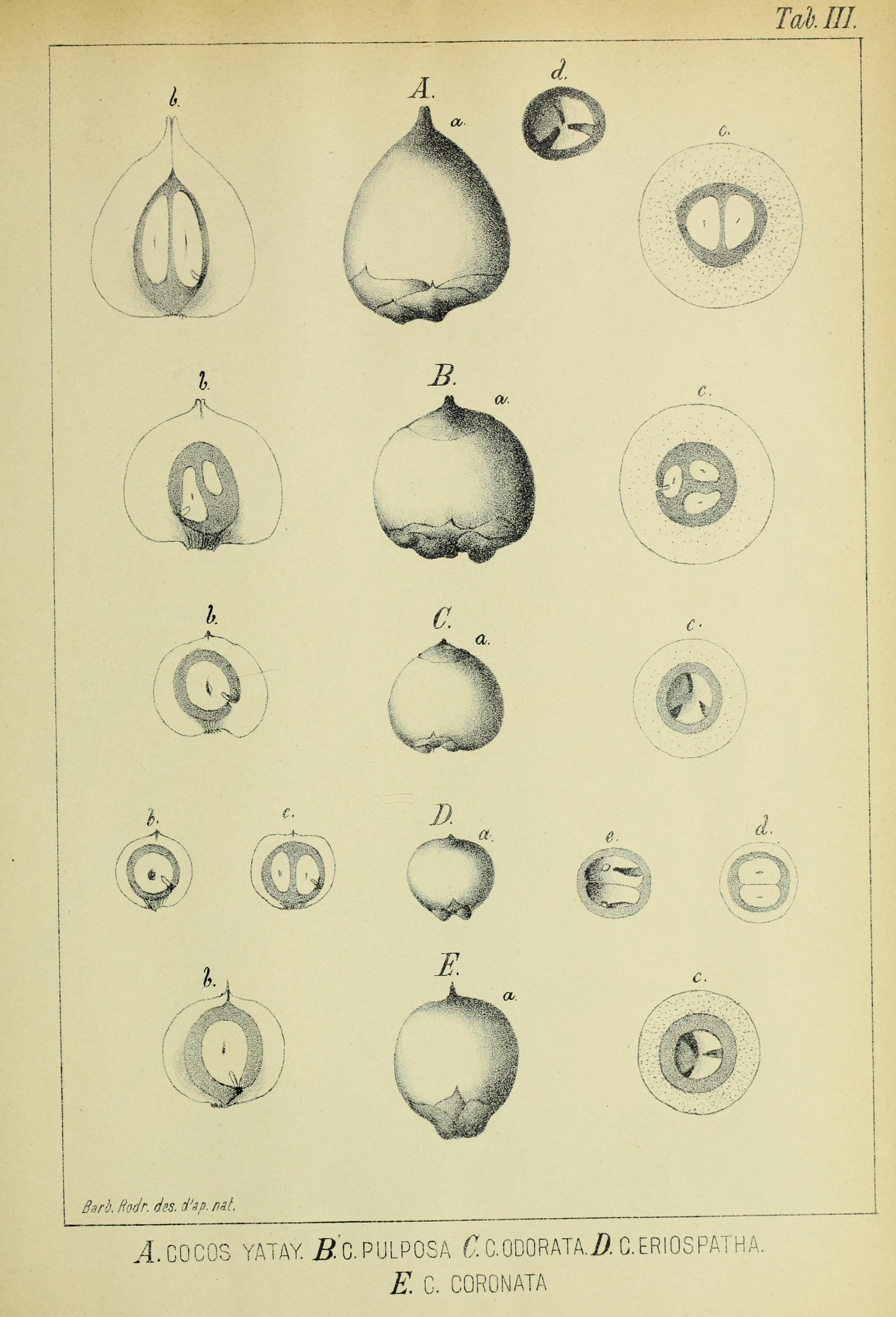
Comparison of fruit by João Barbosa Rodrigues in 1901. B. yatay is 'A' (note the large fruit); B. odorata is 'B' & 'C', B. eriospatha is 'D', and Syagrus coronata is 'E'.

== See also ==
- El Palmar National Park
- Mburucuyá National Park

== Bibliography ==
- Jorge Chebataroff (1974).- Palmeras del Uruguay. Montevideo, Facultad de Humanidades y Ciencias.
- Burkart, A. 1957. La Vegetación del Delta del Río Paraná. Darwiniana 11(3): 457–561.
- Devoto & Rothkugel. 1942. Índice flora leñosa Argentina. Publ. Misc. Min. Agric. 140: 35–142.
