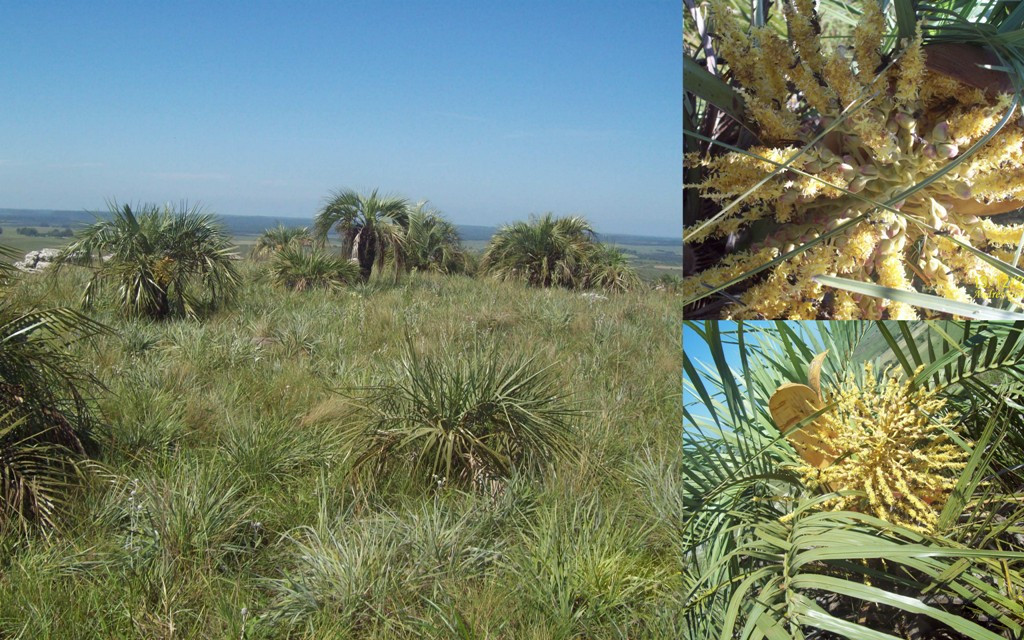
- Butia paraguayensis in the Cerro Miriñaque, Rivera, Uruguay.

Scientific classification
- Kingdom: Plantae
- Clade: Tracheophytes
- Clade: Angiosperms
- Clade: Monocots
- Clade: Commelinids
- Order: Arecales
- Family: Arecaceae
- Genus: Butia
- Species: B. paraguayensis

Binomial name
- Butia paraguayensis (Barb.Rodr.) L.H.Bailey [1936]

Synonyms
- Cocos paraguayensis Barb.Rodr. [1899]; Butia yatay var. paraguayensis (Barb.Rodr.) Becc. [1916]; Syagrus paraguayensis (Barb.Rodr.) Glassman [1970]; Butia yatay subsp. paraguayensis (Barb.Rodr.) Xifreda & Sanso [1996]; Cocos amadelpha Barb.Rodr. [1900]; Cocos dyerana Barb.Rodr. [1903]; Cocos wildemaniana Barb.Rodr. [1903]; Butia pungens Becc. [1916]; Syagrus dyerana (Barb.Rodr.) Becc. [1916]; Butia amadelpha (Barb.Rodr.) Burret [1930]; Butia wildemaniana (Barb.Rodr.) Burret [1930]; Syagrus amadelpha (Barb.Rodr.) Frambach ex Dahlgren [1936]; Syagrus wildemaniana (Barb.Rodr.) Frambach ex Dahlgren [1936]; Butia dyerana (Barb.Rodr.) Burret [1937]

= Butia paraguayensis =

Species of palm

Butia paraguayensis is a species of Butia palm tree found in the cerrado region of South America. Its natural range runs from Mato Grosso do Sul and São Paulo in southern Brazil through Paraguay to northern Argentina and Uruguay. It was given the name dwarf yatay palm in English by 2000, and it is locally known as yata'i in Guaraní in Paraguay, or butiá-do-cerrado in Portuguese in Rio Grande do Sul, Brazil.

== Taxonomy ==
Many researchers have considered it a dwarf variety of Butia yatay.

In 1916 Odoardo Beccari reduced Cocos paraguayensis to a variety of Butia yatay, yet at the same time he described a new species from San Ignacio, Misiones, Argentina, which he named B. pungens.

In 1970 Sidney Fredrick Glassman moved this species, along with all other Butia, to Syagrus, but in 1979 he changed his mind and moved everything back.

In a 1979 review of the genus Butia by Glassman, he continued to distinguish B. pungens, believing B. paraguayensis did not occur in Misiones province, but since at least 1996 this taxon is now considered a synonym of B. paraguayensis.

A population of Butia palms in Paraguay once known as B. dyerana was considered a synonym of B. yatay by Glassman, but this population was reclassified as a synonym of B. paraguayensis by at least 1996, removing B. yatay from the flora of Paraguay.

== Distribution ==
In Paraguay this species is very common; it occurs in the departments of Amambay, Caaguazú, Caazapá, Canindeyú, Concepción, Cordillera, Guairá, Misiones, Ñeembucú, and San Pedro. In Brazil it occurs in the states of Mato Grosso do Sul, Paraná, Rio Grande do Sul, and São Paulo. Lorenzi et al. also reported a population in southeast Minas Gerais in 2004, as did Noblick in 2010. In Argentina it occurs in the provinces of Corrientes and Misiones (in San Ignacio). In Uruguay it has historically been recorded as being native to the departments of Artigas and Rivera, but the distribution has been severely reduced due to agricultural development and presently the species is restricted to a single population of 175 individuals located on private property on the Cerro del Miriñaque, a hill in the Rivera department (see pictures).

Bauermann et al. investigated the possibility of using palm pollen, including this species, in palynology, in order to try to provide more detail about the ancient changes in habitat in the state Rio Grande do Sul in Brazil by tracking the changes in distribution and abundance of the palms, but were unable to provide much detail on the subject.

=== Habitat ===
It grows in the cerrado (a type of savannah grassland) and pastures. It occurs on well-drained, usually sandy soils. In Rio Grande do Sul, Brazil, it is exclusively found growing on clayey (probably lateritic) soils. It grows from 100 to 300m in altitude.

== Description ==
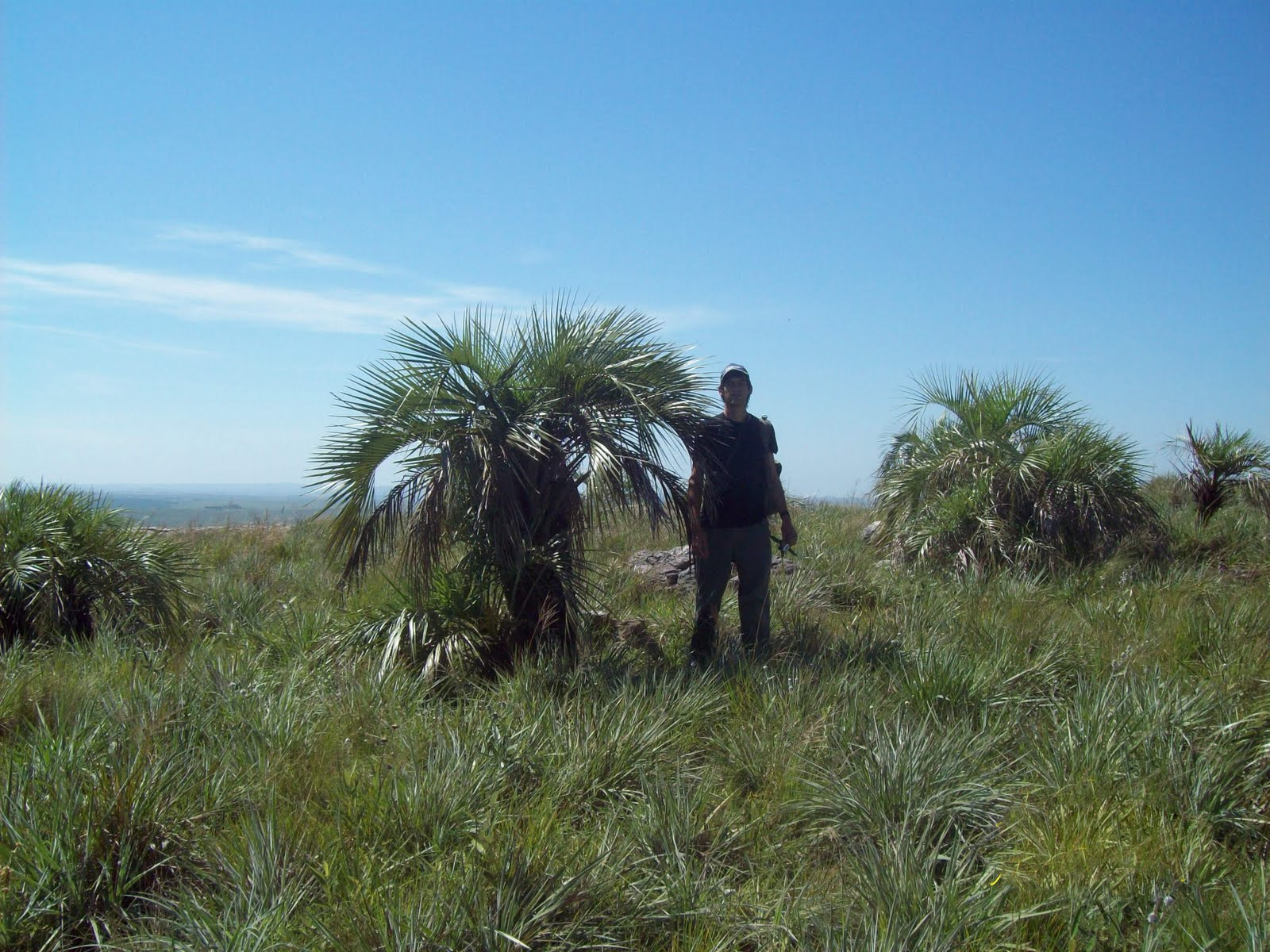
Butia paraguayensis on the Cerro Miriñaque, Rivera, Uruguay.

Butia paraguayensis is a short, always solitary-trunked palm usually forming a subterranean trunk -although great variability is shown with some specimens forming large trunks above ground up to 2m high.

The 6 to 20 arched pinnate leaves range from a glaucous to dark-green and the petiole margins are covered in fibres and a row of spines up to 4 cm long.

In common with B. yatay with which it shares some of the same range, the female flowers are much larger than the male.

Like all species of Butia studied, this species has relatively larger pollen grains than that of other genera of palm present in Rio Grande do Sul, Brazil. These grains are bilaterally symmetrical, oblate, monosulcate, and with the end piriform (pear-shaped). The surface is covered in minute 2μm-large reticulate patterns.

The fruit are variable and may be shaped conical or ovoid, as well as being coloured green, purple, red, orange or yellow at maturity. The fruit are 3-4 x 2-3 cm, juicy, slightly fibrous, taste sweet-sour, with a persistent perianth base and 1-3 large nuts with homogeneous endosperm.

=== Similar species ===
It is often confused with (immature) Butia yatay. B. yatay always has a trunk, and is taller, with much larger leaves and inflorescences. In the past it was seen as a synonym of that species.

== Ecology ==
It is well-adapted to the periodic wildfires of the cerrado.

In the Mbaracayú Forest Nature Reserve the ferns Pleopeltis decumanum usually, and P. hirsutissima and Serpocaulon latipes on occasion, grow as epiphytes upon the trunks of this palm. Orchids of the genus Catasetum grow here as well.

The rare bird Caprimulgus candicans, the white-winged nightjar, appears to prefer open grassland with low density stands of these palms (campo sucio) as habitat.

In Paraguay the fruit are a favourite food of the maned wolf, which may be an important seed disperser. Parrots and macaws also make use of the ripe fruit.

== Uses ==
In Paraguay the fruit and palm hearts are eaten by local tribal communities (Ava Chiripá, Aché, others). The leaves are also used to make hats and other handicrafts. The unripe, green fruit are believed to be useful for combating intestinal worms. In Paraguay the nuts are reputed to be of good use as fish bait.

The fruit are not considered edible in Argentina.

In Uruguay the single remaining, picturesque population has some ecotourism value.

This species is sometimes, be it rarely, cultivated (in Argentina, England, California). It is advised to plant the palms in full sunlight. It is said to take −11 °C, but should be protected at −4 °C in the Netherlands.

== Conservation ==
In Uruguay this species is now very rare (175 plants on a single hill) due to habitat loss due to agricultural activities such as cattle ranching and forestry (pulpwood plantations of eucalyptus). Sheep and cattle eat the seedlings, preventing recruitment. As of 2017, like all four species of Butia native to Uruguay, it is protected by law. Adult palms may not be felled or moved without government permission.
