= Underground stem =

Part of some vascular plants

Underground stems are modified plant parts that derive from stem tissue but exist under the soil surface. They function as storage tissues for food and nutrients, facilitate the propagation of new clones, and aid in perennation (survival from one growing season to the next). Types of underground stems include bulbs, corms, rhizomes, stolons, and tubers.

Plants have two structures or axes of growth, which can be best seen from seed germination and growth. Seedlings develop two axes of growth: stems, which develop upward out of the soil, and roots, which develop downward. The roots are modified to have root hairs and branch indiscriminately with cells that take in water and nutrients, while the stems are modified to move water and nutrients to and from the leaves and flowers. Stems have nodes with buds where leaves and flowers arise at specific locations, while roots do not. Plants use underground stems to multiply by asexual reproduction and to survive from one year to the next, usually through dormancy. Some plants produce stems modified to store energy and preserve a location of potential growth to survive a cold or dry period which normally is a period of inactive growth, and when that period is over the plants resume new growth from the underground stems.

Being underground protects the stems from the elements during the dormancy period, such as freezing and thawing in winter, extreme heat and drought in summer, or other potentially harmful elements such as fire. They can also protect plants from heavy grazing pressure from animals, the plant might be eaten to the ground but new growth can occur from below ground stem that can not be reached by the herbivores. Several plants, including weedy species, use underground stems to spread and colonize large areas, since the stems do not have to be supported or strong, less energy and resources are needed to produce these stems and often these plants have more mass underground than above ground.

== Types of underground stems ==
Different forms of underground stems include:

- Bulb - Short, upright organ leaves modified into thick flesh scales. Tulips, daffodils and Lilies.
- Corm - Short, upright, hard, or fleshy stems covered with thin, dry papery leaves.
- Rhizome - With reduced scale-like leaves. The top can generate leafy stems while the bottom can produce roots. Iris and many grasses.
- Stolon - Horizontal stems that run at or just below the soil surface with nodes that root and long internodes, the ends produce new plants. When above ground they are called "runners".
- Tuber - An enlarged fleshy end of a stem, generally from rhizomes but often also referring to thickened roots.

A number of underground stems are consumed by people including; onion, potato, ginger, yam and taro.

The below-ground stems of grasses have scales, while roots are smooth without scales.

== Geophyte ==
A geophyte (earth+plant) is a plant with an underground storage organ including true bulbs, corms, tubers, tuberous roots, enlarged hypocotyls, and rhizomes. Most plants with underground stems are geophytes but not all plants that are geophytes have underground stems. Geophytes are often physiologically active even when they lack leaves. They can survive during adverse environmental conditions by going into a state of quiesce and later resume growth from their storage organs, which contain reserves of carbohydrates and water when the environmental conditions are favorable again.
