= Centro Nacional de Conservação da Flora =

Brazilian plant conservation organisation

The Centro Nacional de Conservação da Flora (CNCFlora) is a Brazilian nonprofit organization that determines extinction risk of various Brazilian plant species. It intends to create a Red List (lista vermelha in Portuguese) of plants – a reference work of assessments of the state of conservation of the native plant species of Brazil. It is hosted at the Rio de Janeiro Botanical Garden. It partnered with the Rafael Loyola Conservation Biogeography Lab, the International Union for Conservation of Nature (IUCN) and Botanic Gardens Conservation International. It is supported financially by the Global Environment Facility, the Brazilian Ministry of Environment, as well as the Fundo Brasileiro para Biodiversidade and Associação Instituto V5.

CNC Flora Red List category abbreviations following the IUCN criteria (version 3.1, 2001)

Conservation statuses of various Brazilian plant species is done by performing a risk assessment analysis, applying IUCN-recommended standards and procedures, then assigning said species to conservation categories as dictated by the IUCN.

The goal is to investigate the status of all species by 2020.

== History ==
In 2013, a list of threatened species was published. As a result, the Brazilian government extended legal protection to a total of 2,113 species in 2014.

In 2017, 31% of the Brazilian flora was estimated to be assessed by 2020, with a possibility that the entire flora biome will be assessed by 2030.

Of approximately 36,400 native terrestrial vascular plants and bryophytes thought to grow in Brazil, 5,646 species had been evaluated as of December 2018. 6,029 assessments were carried out, but various taxa (classifications) later appeared to be synonyms or were unrecognized as valid species.

In the summer of 2019, 6,046 of the 46,223 named plants (including aquatic plants, ferns, mosses, and algae) recorded in Brazil had been assessed, of which 2,953 were considered threatened (with a status of vulnerable to higher). Action plan for 332 species had been devised.

Long-term funding remains a problem.
