= Butia arenicola =

Scientific classification
- Kingdom: Plantae
- Clade: Tracheophytes
- Clade: Angiosperms
- Clade: Monocots
- Clade: Commelinids
- Order: Arecales
- Family: Arecaceae
- Genus: Butia
- Species: B. arenicola

Binomial name
- Butia arenicola (Barb.Rodr.) Burret [1930]

Synonyms
- Cocos arenicola Barb.Rodr. [1903]; Syagrus arenicola (Barb.Rodr.) Frambach ex Dahlgren [1936]

Species of palm

Butia arenicola is a very small species of Butia palm with an underground trunk; native to Paraguay and the state of Mato Grosso do Sul in Brazil. Boquierinho is recorded as a possible local vernacular name for it (if the specimen was correctly identified).

== Etymology ==
The species epithet arenicola refers to the habitat it was originally collected in: harēna or arēna is Latin for 'sand', the suffix -cola is Latin for 'inhabiting'.

== Taxonomy ==
Butia arenicola was collected by the Swiss physician and botanist Émile Hassler in Paraguay, in sandy plains in the highlands of the Cordillera de Altos in January 1898 – 1899. It was first formally described as Cocos arenicola by João Barbosa Rodrigues in 1903, using this specimen as a type.

Max Burret, working in Berlin, moved this taxon to Butia in 1930. Meanwhile, in the United States, Frambach had taken to calling this taxon Syagrus arenicola, although he did not formally move the species. Dahlgren validated this name in 1936.

Sidney Glassman recognised the taxon in 1970 under this last name, but in 1979 changed his mind and recognised it under Butia. In 1970 Glassman, who had not travelled to the region to observe the plants in situ, considered the species identifiable in most of the specimens labelled as such that he had examined, but in his entry about the taxon he presents a large amount of text expressing doubts that this dwarf taxon might merely be immature individuals of Butia capitata (in which he included B. odorata), as he theorized that perhaps certain characters which set this taxon apart, such as reduced pinnae (leaflet) width and size of the trunk and inflorescence, were in fact related to age of the specimen. Note that both B. capitata and B. odorata occur far from where B. arenicola was known to grow at the time. An 1848 collection by Anders Fredrik Regnell in Uberaba, Minas Gerais, much earlier than Hassler's collection of the type, was classified as a combination of an inflorescence of Syagrus aff. arenicola and a leaf of S. flexuosa by Glassman in 1968. Glassman further determined a group of specimens collected by William Andrew Archer and Augusto Gehrt in 1936 in Jaraguari, Mato Grosso do Sul, to be S. aff. arenicola. Glassman lastly also identified as S. aff. arenicola a specimen collected by Amaro Macedo in 1950 at a locality likely to be Nova Ponte along the Rio Verde, in Água Clara, Mato Grosso do Sul. Note that this area is also the type locality for Butia matogrossensis. Glassman reclassified all these collections as B. arenicola in 1982.

In 1995 Henderson et al. considered this taxon a synonym of B. paraguayensis. Rafaël Govaerts followed them in 1996, as did Govaerts & Dransfield in 2005, and Lorenzi et al. in the Arecaceae of the 2010 Flora Brasileira.

Larry Noblick, a US palm expert, did not follow this interpretation, and was determining herbarium exxicata as B. arenicola by 2007. Noblick re-examined at least one specimen which had been assigned to B. paraguayensis and reassigned this to B. arenicola: an 1882 collection by Benjamin Balansa in Valenzuela, Cordillera department, Paraguay, also collected earlier than Hassler's collection of the type.

In 2009 Irene M. Gauto recognised this taxon as a distinct species, despite otherwise following Henderson et al. in her work acquiring a Masters in Biology degree at the University of Geneva. In 2011 she, along with two co-authors, published an updated version of this work, in which Butia arenicola was again recognised.

Soares in 2015 followed these later works in recognising this taxon as a valid, independent species. He, along with R. Pimenta, collected a specimen in 2012 in between the municipalities of Água Clara and Três Lagoas in Mato Grosso do Sul, Brazil, which he identified as B. arenicola. In 2015 he published a treatment of the entire genus Butia in which he published his opinion on the matter, and this was followed in the Arecaceae section of the Lista de Espécies da Flora do Brasil published by Leitman et al. in 2015.

== Description ==
This is a solitary-trunked palm with a subterranean trunk only 5 by 8 cm in size. The 3 to 8 leaves have a 15–34 cm by 1 cm wide petiole with a margin toothed with tiny teeth to only 1mm in length, and a rachis 70–85 cm in length with 12-30 pairs of pinnae (leaflets) placed at regular intervals in one plane (each pair forming a 'V'-shape). The pinnae in the middle of leaf are 35–45 cm in length and 0.5-1.1 cm in width. The branched inflorescence is protected in a woody spathe 30–40 cm in length, of which the swollen part is 10–28 cm long by 1.5–3 cm wide; this spathe is usually glabrous (hairless) but may rarely be covered in a tomentose indumentum. The inflorescence has a 13–25 cm long peduncle with a 0.5–15 cm long rachis with 3-22 rachillae (branches) 8–18 cm long. The flowers are coloured cream-yellow or purple. The pistillate (female) flower is only 0.5–0.8mm in length; the staminate (male) flower 0.8-1mm. The shape of the fruit and that of the nut within is ovoid. The 2.2-2.4 cm by 1.2-1.8 cm fruit are coloured brownish-yellow, with yellow acidic-sweet flesh, and contain 1 to 2 seeds within the 1-1.3 cm by 0.9-1.1 cm nut.

=== Similar species ===
In 1979 Glassman provided a key which contrasted this species with Butia capitata (in which he included B. odorata), in which he considered the main difference to be the small trunk, the generally smaller dimensions of the pinnae, spathe, spadix, as well as a one-seeded fruit and tiny 2mm petiolar teeth as opposed to 11 cm-long spines in B. capitata. He distinguished both B. arenicola and B. capitata from B. eriospatha by the hairless spathes.

Soares considers the species the most similar to B. matogrossensis. It can be distinguished by always having smaller vegetative parts and sometimes by differences in the relative sizes of the spathe and inflorescence, with B. arenicola having an inflorescence generally enclosed within the spathe.

In his 2017 key to the genus, Marcelo Piske Eslabão also contrasts it to B. matogrossensis, distinguishing it from this species by yellow instead of red fruit, and smaller spathes and pistillate flowers.

It grows in the same areas as B. lepidotispatha, as well as B. paraguayensis and B. exospadix. In the Yaguareté Forest in Paraguay it occurs together with B. lepidotispatha and B. exospadix.

== Distribution ==
It grows in the state of Mato Grosso do Sul in Brazil and specimens have been collected in the departments of Amambay, Canindeyú, Central, Cordillera, Itapúa, Misiones and San Pedro in Paraguay.

Glassman determined two collections from Mato Grosso do Sul as B. arenicola in 1982: one in Jaraguari in 1936, and one in likely Água Clara in 1950. It is now unclear if these identifications were correct. Gauto et al. state their belief in 2011 that this taxon is endemic to Paraguay; it is unclear if that means they disregarded the Brazilian specimens determined as Butia arenicola by Glassman as misidentified, or were unaware of them. In any case, in 2012 Soares collected it again in Mato Grosso do Sul in Três Lagoas, confirming its presence. By 2017 it had been collected (or identified as such) in at least two locations in Brazil; the afore-mentioned collection by Soares and a 1987 collection from Bela Vista by E.L. Perez.

It may have been collected in Uberaba, Minas Gerais in 1848, but it is unclear if Glassman correctly identified this collection.

With an estimated extent of occurrence of approximately 17,500 km^{2}, it has a wider range than most species within the genus Butia. Within this estimated extent of occurrence, it was calculated to occupy some 10,000 km^{2} (the area of occupancy), giving it an abundance of 57%, which is rather average within the genus Butia. As of 2017 it is known from at least 13 collection localities.

== Habitat ==
It grows in cerrado in Brazil. It grows in cerrado and a habitat called "wet chaco" in Paraguay. The areas it grows in have marked seasonal differences, with a cooler, very wet winter where the surface may temporarily be flooded in low-lying places, and hot and dry summers with often prolonged droughts.

== Conservation ==
In 2011 Gauto et al. considered this species to be of 'least concern' in Paraguay. They consider it probable that it has a wider distribution than at that time known, and that it is likely under-collected, although they mention that so little collection of this taxon has occurred that the low amount of specimens they used in their calculations may cause their method of estimating the population to show a larger extent of occurrence than may actually be the case.

As of 2018 the conservation status has not been evaluated by the Centro Nacional de Conservação da Flora in Brazil, but in a 2017 dissertation by Eslabão he advocates to classify the species as 'vulnerable' for Brazil as the IUCN categories B1ab (i, ii, iii) apply; this means that the estimated extent of occurrence (see distribution above) was lower than 20,000 km^{2}, it occurs in less than 10 localities in Brazil, and that according to Eslabão the population was highly fragmented and in decline.

The only known population to be found protected within a nature conservation area is at the Yacyretá Dam Island Reserve at Parque Nacional Lago Ypacarai in Itapua, Paraguay, with three known localities here.
