= Butia pubispatha =

Scientific classification
- Kingdom: Plantae
- Clade: Tracheophytes
- Clade: Angiosperms
- Clade: Monocots
- Clade: Commelinids
- Order: Arecales
- Family: Arecaceae
- Genus: Butia
- Species: B. pubispatha

Binomial name
- Butia pubispatha Noblick & Lorenzi, 2010

Species of palm

Butia pubispatha is a very small and extremely rare species of Butia palm with an underground trunk; endemic to the east of the state of Paraná in southeastern Brazil.

== Etymology ==
The specific epithet refers to the pubescent (downy) hairs on the outer surface of the spathe.

At least one seed vendor has used the name broom jelly palm for this species.

== Taxonomy ==
Butia pubispatha was discovered, and the type specimen and live plants collected, by Harri Lorenzi and Kelen Pureza Soares in 2008. In 2009 Lorenzi was growing and studying the plants in his Plantarum Institute and Larry R. Noblick and Lorenzi described B. catarinensis, B. matogrossensis and B. pubispatha in 2010 in the Flora brasileira: Arecaceae (palmeiras) by Lorenzi et al. (Noblick also described B. lepidotispatha in 2010).

== Description ==
This is a palm with a solitary, underground trunk 5-20cm in diameter. The trunk is usually subterranean, but it may occasionally breach the ground with age.

It has 4-13 leaves; these have a 5-18cm long unarmed petiole which has margins fringed with fibres. The rachis of the leaf is 25-65cm long and has 16-28 pairs of pinnae (leaflets) arranged regularly down its length and inserted in a single plane per side of the leaf, a pair of pinnae thus forming a neat 'V'-shape. The pinnae in the middle of the leaf blade are 20-32cm long and 0.4-1cm wide. In the wild the leaves are recorded as coloured greyish-green, the petioles yellowish. In cultivation the leaves are bluish-green, and young leaves are very finely coated in a white wax.

The inflorescence is branched to a single degree. The developing inflorescence is protected within a 20-33cm long spathe with an enlarged portion which is 10-18cm long and 1.4-3cm wide. The spathe is coloured green, has a woody consistency and the outer surface is covered in short, rusty-coloured, pubescent (downy) hairs that fall off easily and as the spathe matures. The inflorescence is finely coated in pale-coloured wax. The rachis of the inflorescence is only 1-4cm long, with 1-5 rachillae (branches) which are 6-15cm long. The flowers are coloured purple or purplish-yellow. The staminate (male) flowers are 9mm long; the pistillate (female), 7-8 by 7-8mm.

The ripe fruit are coloured greenish-purple, ovoid-shaped, 2-2.5cm long and 1.8-2.9cm wide. The flesh is yellow and sweet-sour. The nut within is hard, 1.5-1.8cm long and 1-1.2cm wide, and usually contains a single seed. The shape of the nut has been said to be ovoid or elliptic-shaped, or globose (round).

The plants look like a clump of grass.

=== Similar species ===
Soares considers it most similar to Butia microspadix, differing from that species by the spathes being covered in short pubescent hairs that fall off, whereas those of B. microspadix have long and persistent hairs upon their stem. It also grows much faster and is more robust than B. microspadix.

In a key to the genus provided in 2014, Noblick contrasts it to B. marmorii, but the spathe in that species is papery, smooth or scaly, and the inflorescence has a much shorter peduncle and rachillae.

It grows in the same region as B. eriospatha and B. microspadix.

== Distribution & habitat ==
This plant is extremely rare. As of 2017 it has not been found anywhere except the type locality in the east of the state of Paraná in southeastern Brazil. It was discovered and collected in 2008 along a highway in the municipality of Jaguariaíva.

It grows in sunny high altitude grassland, near a river, in sandy soils.

== Cultivation ==
Seeds have been offered for sale. It has been grown by at least two collectors as of 2014.

== Conservation ==
As of 2018 the Centro Nacional de Conservação da Flora has not yet rated the conservation status for Brazil, and it is listed as 'not evaluated'. It was grown ex situ in the Jardim Botânico Plantarum in Nova Odessa, São Paulo, Brazil, by 2009. As of 2017 the locality is protected within a conservation area, the geological park Área de Preservação Ambiental da Escarpa Devoniana, but much of the nearby area has been converted to soya cultivation.

This species is extremely rare, the least known of the Brazilian Butia species, known only from a single locality and rarely grown in cultivation. It is so rare or little studied that in a 2017 study attempting to calculate population abundance it was deemed 'data deficient' (along with B. witeckii, which has been collected in two localities).
