= Butia catarinensis =

Scientific classification
- Kingdom: Plantae
- Clade: Tracheophytes
- Clade: Angiosperms
- Clade: Monocots
- Clade: Commelinids
- Order: Arecales
- Family: Arecaceae
- Genus: Butia
- Species: B. catarinensis

Binomial name
- Butia catarinensis Noblick & Lorenzi [2010]

Species of palm

Butia catarinensis is a mid-sized species of Butia palm native to the states of Rio Grande do Sul, Santa Catarina in Brazil.

== Etymology ==
The specific epithet refers to the Brazilian state of Santa Catarina where it is the most distributed.

== Taxonomy & nomenclature ==
These palms were only named as a new species in 2010, although the populations of this species were known. Before 2010 the palms growing in this region were classified as Butia capitata.

J. R. Mattos reclassified this population as B. capitata var. odorata in 1977 (see B. odorata),

As such, a number of palms under cultivation in botanical gardens, private collections or in the nursery trade under the name B. capitata or B. capitata var. odorata are in fact this species.

Larry R. Noblick and Harri Lorenzi described B. catarinensis, B. matogrossensis and B. pubispatha in 2010 in the Flora brasileira: Arecaceae (palmeiras) by Lorenzi et al. (Noblick also described B. lepidotispatha in 2010).

== Description ==
This is a solitary-trunked palm, the trunk being 0.2–2 m (0.7–6.6 ft), exceptionally 4 m (13 ft), tall, with a diameter of 15–43 cm (5.9–16.9 in). The trunk is covered with the persistent bases of the old palm fronds. These fronds are 9–32 in number and arranged in a spiral around the trunk. The blade is 50–120 cm (20–47 in) by 7–15 cm (3–6 in). The petiole is glabrous (hairless), 18–64 cm (7–25 in) in length and 1.5–2.4 cm (0.59–0.94 in) wide, flat on top and round elsewhere. The margins of the petioles are densely toothed with numerous, robust, up to 4 cm (1.6 in) long spines, and many flattened fibres when the leaves are young. The rachis of the leaf is 65–190 cm (26–75 in) in length, with 48-62 pairs of pinnae (leaflets) which are glaucous-coloured and arranged uniformly along the rachis. Unlike other species of Butia (except B. odorata), these are usually in the same plane, but sometimes inserted at very slightly divergent angels along the rachis, but without giving the leaf a plumose aspect such as in Syagrus, and with each pair of pinnae forming a neat V-shape. The pinnae in the middle of the leaf blade are 35–75 cm (14–30 in) long and 1.3–2.3 cm (0.51–0.91 in) in width.

The inflorescence is branched to the 1st degree, has a peduncle 29–77 cm (11–30 in) long and 1.6–1.9 cm (0.63–0.75 in) wide, and has a prophyll 19–47 cm (7.5–18.5 in) long, 3.2–5.5 cm (1.3–2.2 in) wide, and covered in a brown tomentum. The young inflorescence develops in a glabrous, lightly striated, woody spathe which is 65–110 cm (26–43 in) in length and has an enlarged portion at the end which is 33–73 cm (13–29 in) long 8–17 cm (3.1–6.7 in) wide and ending in a short, sharply pointed tip. The axis (width?) of the inflorescence is 30–60 cm (12–24 in) long. The rachis of the inflorescence is 72–186 cm (28–73 in) long and has 35-135 rachillae (branches) which are 10–45 cm (3.9–17.7 in) long. The flowers can be coloured yellow, greenish-yellow, yellow and violet, or completely violet. The staminate (male) flowers are 9–10 mm (0.4–0.4 in) in length; the pistillate (female) flowers are 5–10 mm (0.2–0.4 in).

The shapes of both the fruit and nut are ovoid. The ripe fruit are coloured yellow, orange, or red. The fruit are 1.4–2.2 cm (0.6–0.9 in) long, 1.2–2.6 cm (0.47–1.02 in) wide, have a persistent perianth, and have a yellow, juicy, lightly fibrous flesh. The nut is hard, 1.2–1.4 cm (0.5–0.6 in) long, 0.8–1.2 cm (0.3–0.5 in) wide, dark-brown coloured, contains a homogeneous endosperm, and has 1 to 2, rarely 3, seeds within. The nut is without a beak or other sort protuberance on its apex.

=== Similar species ===
It is very similar to Butia odorata, a palm with a similar habitat but further south along the coast, but may be distinguished from this species by its much smaller height, almost always to just 2 m (6.6 ft).

== Distribution ==
It is native to the states of Santa Catarina and Rio Grande do Sul in Brazil. It grows in the lowlands situated in a relatively narrow strip along the coast from the municipalities of Araquari in Santa Catarina to Osório in Rio Grande do Sul.

== Habitat ==
It is typically found growing not far from the coast in restinga, a type of dry, coastal, tropical thorn-scrub. It grows on coastal dunes and older stabilised dunes further inland. It appears to prefer densely vegetated or wooded environments. It grows in sandy and rocky soils.

== Uses ==
The edible fruit of this palm are collected for myriad uses where the trees grow naturally in Brazil.

== Conservation ==
As of 2018 the Centro Nacional de Conservação da Flora has not yet rated the conservation status for Brazil, and it is listed as 'not evaluated'.
