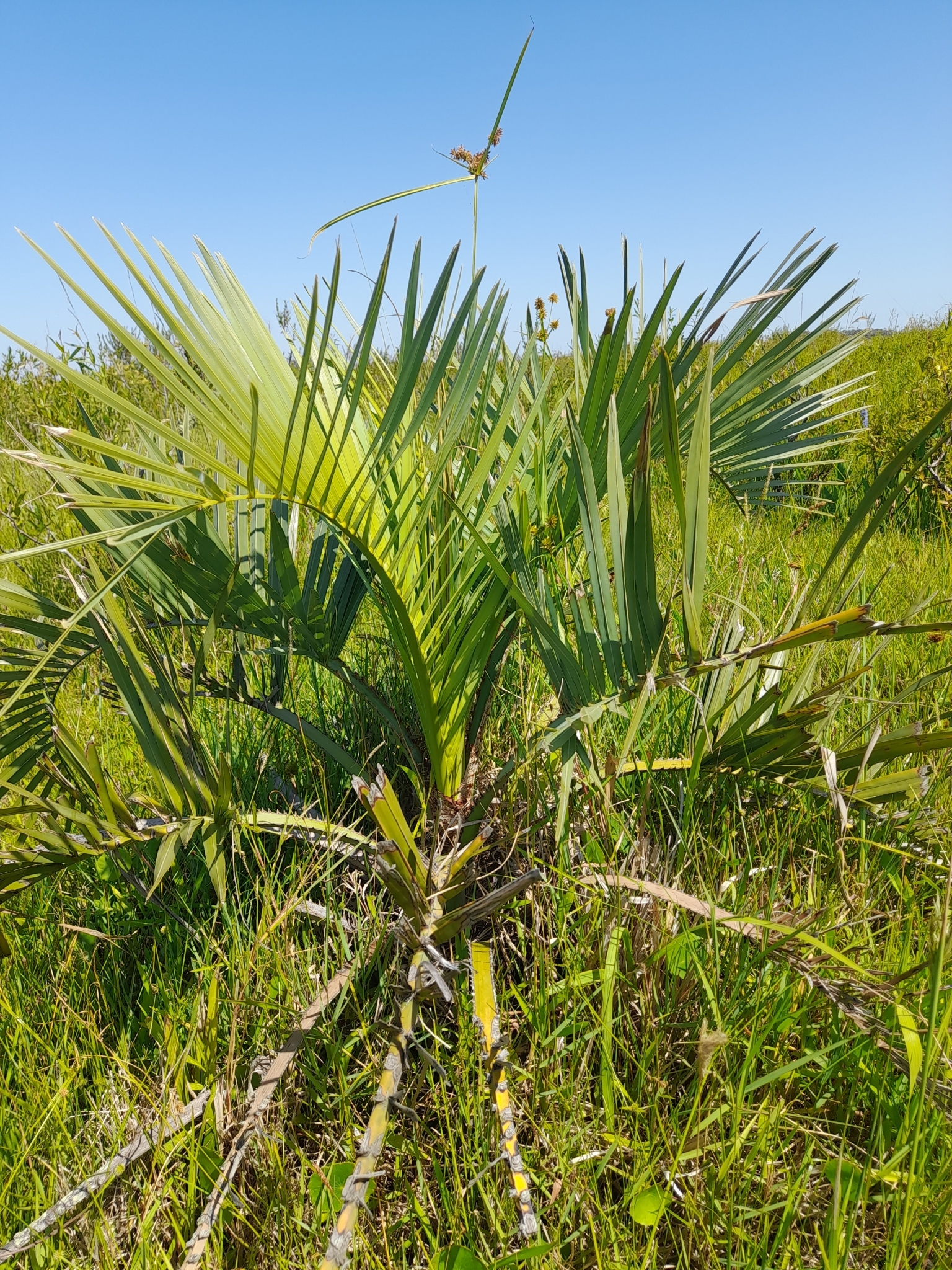
- Butia odorata growing wild at Lago Merín, Cerro Largo Department, Uruguay

Scientific classification
- Kingdom: Plantae
- Clade: Embryophytes
- Clade: Tracheophytes
- Clade: Angiosperms
- Clade: Monocots
- Clade: Commelinids
- Order: Arecales
- Family: Arecaceae
- Genus: Butia
- Species: B. odorata

Binomial name
- Butia odorata (Barb.Rodr.) Noblick [2011]

Synonyms
- Cocos odorata Barb.Rodr. Pl. Jard. Rio de Janeiro 1: 14 [1891]; Cocos pulposa Barb.Rodr. [1891]; Cocos elegantissima Chabaud, nom. illeg. [1906]; Cocos erythrospatha Chabaud [1906]; Cocos lilaceiflora Chabaud [1906]; Butia capitata var. elegantissima Becc. [1916]; Butia capitata var. erythrospatha (Chabaud) Becc. [1916]; Butia capitata var. lilaceiflora (Chabaud) Becc. [1916]; Butia capitata var. pulposa (Barb.Rodr.) Becc. [1916]; Butia capitata var. subglobosa Becc. [1916]; Butia capitata var. virescens Becc. [1916]; Cocos nehrlingiana Abbott ex Nehrl. [1927]; Butia nehrlingiana (Abbott ex Nehrl.) Nehrl. [1929]; Butia pulposa (Barb.Rodr.) Nehrl. [1929]; Butia capitata var. nehrlingiana (Abbott ex Nehrl.) L.H.Bailey [1936]; Butia capitata var. strictior L.H.Bailey [1936]; ?Butia capitata var. rubra J.R. Mattos [1977]; Butia odorata (Barb.Rodr.) Noblick & Pirani [2004], nom. inval.; Butia odorata (Barb.Rodr.) Noblick & Lorenzi [2010], nom. inval.

= Butia odorata =

Species of palm tree

Butia odorata, also known as the South American jelly palm, jelly palm, or pindo palm, is a Butia palm native to southernmost Brazil and Uruguay. This slow-growing palm grows up to 10m, although it is often less tall. It is identifiable by its feather palm pinnate leaves that arch inwards towards a thick stout trunk.

== Nomenclature ==
These palms are often called Butia capitata in horticulture. It was seen as a synonym of that more tropical species until 2011, and many botanical gardens, collectors, and those in the nursery trade have not yet changed their labelling. Even more confusingly; plants with the invented name B. capitata var. odorata have circulated in the horticultural trade which were actually the in 2010 newly named B. catarinensis, from further north along the Brazilian coast.

In Rio Grande do Sul, Brazil, local vernacular names for this plant in Portuguese are butiá-da-praia, or just butiá.

=== Etymology ===
The specific epithet odorata is derived from the Latin word for 'perfumed' and was chosen by João Barbosa Rodrigues in 1891 to reflect the highly aromatic nature of the fruit, considered among the best palm fruit for consumption in Brazil at the time.

== Taxonomy ==
Until 2011 this species was lumped together with Butia capitata, a species first described by Karl Friedrich Philipp von Martius in 1826 in montane grasslands in the inner country in Minas Gerais. During fieldwork in the southeast of the state of Bahia, the US palm botanist Larry R. Noblick observed the real B. capitata in situ, and being quite familiar with cultivated B. odorata in Florida where he worked, and having visited the coastal population in 1996, became convinced that they could not represent one of two very disjunct populations of the same species. Noblick incorrectly attempted to separate the taxa twice, in 2004 and 2010, before finally succeeding in 2011, choosing the oldest name which had unambiguously been given to this population: Cocos odorata by João Barbosa Rodrigues (C. pulposa was described in the same work, but O comes before P in the alphabet, so C. odorata has priority).

Odoardo Beccari subsumed this taxon as a variety under B. capitata in 1916 (as B. capitata var. odorata) along with a number of other taxa such as Cocos pulposa, C. elegantissima, C. erythrospatha and C. lilaceiflora, which he all made different varieties of B. capitata. He also named two new taxa as varieties of B. capitata: B. capitata var. subglobosa and B. capitata var. virescens.

In 1936 Liberty Hyde Bailey added two more varieties, B. capitata var. nehrlingiana and B. capitata var. strictior.

J. R. Mattos added yet another in 1977, B. capitata var. rubra, B. capitata thus having eleven different varieties at the time (see below). All except the nominate form are now considered synonyms of B. odorata.

In 1970 Sidney Fredrick Glassman moved this taxon (as B. capitata), along with all other Butia, to Syagrus, but in 1979 he changed his mind and moved everything back.

== Description ==
=== Description ===
==== Habit ====
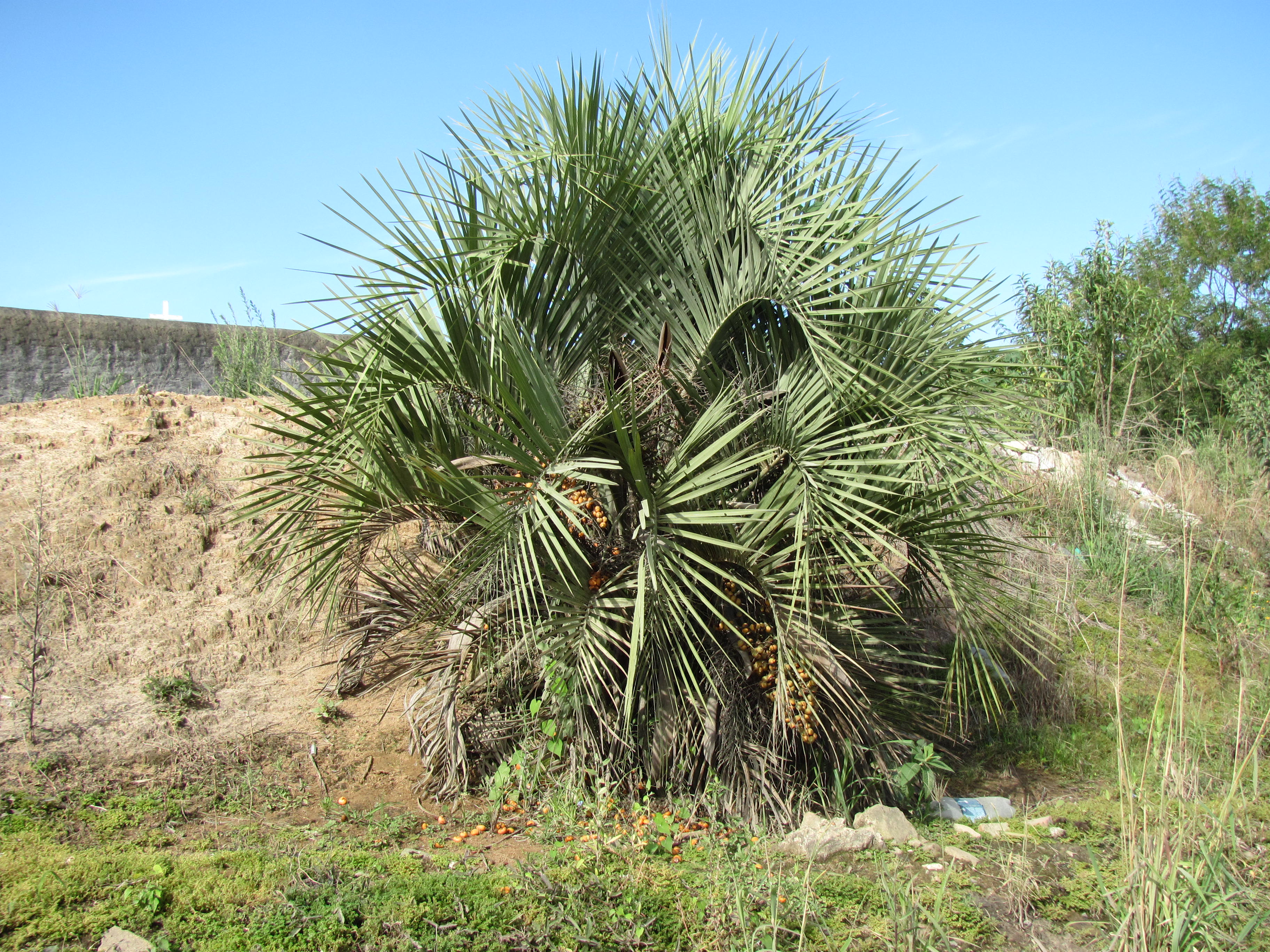
Younger tree in Sertão Santana, Rio Grande do Sul, Brazil.

This is a solitary-trunked palm with a stout erect to slightly inclined trunk, occasionally being subterranean, growing up to 2 to 10m high and 0.32 to 0.6m in diameter. The trunks narrow to 20 cm diameter towards the crown.

==== Leaves ====
It has 13 to 32 pinnate, glaucous to dark-green coloured leaves arching down towards the trunk and arranged spirally around the crown. The petiole is 30–75 cm long, 1-1.2 cm thick, 3.3-3.9 cm wide, and has both stiff rigid fibres and spines up to 5 cm long along the margins (edges) of the petiole. The top of the petiole is flat or slightly convex, the underside is rounded. The rachis of the leaf is 70–200 cm long and has 35 to 60, exceptionally 66, pairs of pinnae (leaflets). Unlike other species of Butia (except B. catariensis), these are inserted in groups of 2 to 4 at slightly divergent angles along the rachis, but without giving the leaf a plumose aspect such as in Syagrus. The pinnae are clustered slightly together near the base of the leaf blade. These pinnae are opposite each other in a pair; each pair forms a neat 'V'-shape. The pinnae in the middle of the leaf blade are 31–60 cm long and 1.2-2.5 cm wide. Basal pinnae are 30–40 cm long and 0.3-0.6 cm wide; apical pinnae are 18–22 cm long and 0.4-0.5 cm wide.

==== Flowers ====
The developing inflorescence is protected in a woody spathe, 60–180 cm in total length, which is usually hairless but may rarely be densely pruinose (covered in waxy flakes) or tomentose (furry); the spathe has a swollen part at the end 33–150 cm long and 6–16 cm wide, and ends in a sharp apex (tip). The inflorescence is branched to the first order. The rachis of the inflorescence is 20–104 cm long and has 35-141 rachillae (flowering branches) 15–132 cm in length. The flowers may be coloured yellow, reddish-orange, purple, yellow & purple, or greenish-yellow. The pistillate (female) flowers are 5-6mm in length; the staminate (male) flowers are 5-7mm in length.

Like all species of Butia studied, this species has relatively larger pollen grains than that of other genera of palm present in Rio Grande do Sul, Brazil. These grains are bilaterally symmetrical, suboblate, monosulcate, and with the end piriform (pear-shaped). The surface is covered in minute 2μm-large reticulate patterns.

==== Fruit ====
The fruit are usually wider than they are long. They are very variable in size; most fruit are 2-3.5 cm by 1.4-4.3 cm. The ripe fruit have a persistent perianth and may be coloured yellow, orange, red, greenish-yellow or purple. The flesh is often yellow but may also be coloured in different hues. The taste is variable, generally sweet and sour, but may be more of one or the other depending on the tree. The fruits are highly aromatic. It has a hard nut which is usually round in shape, sometimes more ovoid, 1.3-2.2 cm by 1.3–2 cm in size, and containing 1 to 3 seeds and a homogeneous endosperm.

=== Similar species ===
It is similar to B. capitata, a smaller plant of the inland cerrado with a less thick trunk and which is not hardy. It has much more elongated, less globose, fruit, and can also be distinguished by tiny details of the leaves.

=== Infraspecific variability ===
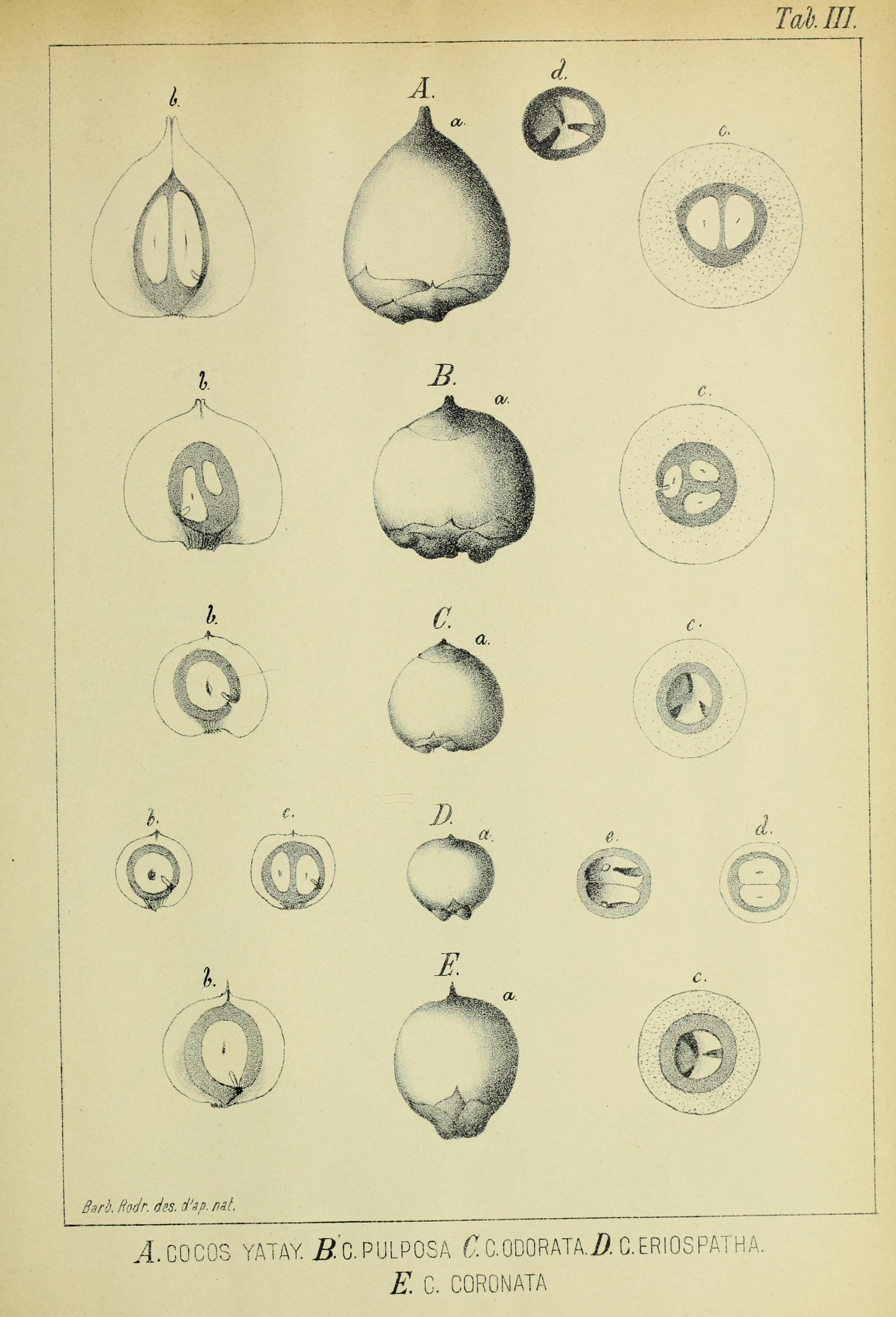
Comparison of fruit by João Barbosa Rodrigues in 1901. B. odorata is 'B' (as Cocos pulposa) & 'C' (as C. odorata) -note the somewhat flatter fruit, which is much larger in the cultivated pulposa race. Butia yatay is 'A', B. eriospatha is 'D', and Syagrus coronata is 'E'.

These palms exhibit much variability in both their native homeland as well as in cultivated specimens. Many of these variable forms were originally described as distinct species. Odoardo Beccari subsumed these as varieties of Butia capitata in 1916. Modern botany would consider these variations to be cultivars or landraces.

- B. capitata var. odorata [1891] - nominate form, yellow fruit.
- B. capitata var. elegantissima, C. elegantissima [1906]
- B. capitata var. erythrospatha, C. erythrospatha [1906] - red-coloured spathes
- B. capitata var. lilaceiflora, C. lilaceiflora [1906]
- B. capitata var. nehrlingiana [1936]
- B. capitata var. pulposa [1891] - much larger fruit (see illustration), often in local cultivation in Brazil and Uruguay.
- B. capitata var. rubra [1977] - red fruit, described from Rio Grande do Sul, Brazil, but forms with this colour fruit also occur in Uruguay.
- B. capitata var. strictior [1936] - cultivated in USA, leaves lacking typical arch except at the very end of the leaf, thus standing almost vertical from the crown.
- B. capitata var. subglobosa [1916]
- B. capitata var. virescens [1916]
- glaucous blue leaves described by Soares & Witeck [2009].

Difference in seed shape from northern vs. southern populations.

==== Hybrids ====
×Butyagrus nabonnandii (Prosch.) Vorster (Mule palm) - This is a hybrid of Butia odorata with Syagrus romanzoffiana found both naturally in the wild as well as in cultivation, it was first described from garden examples in Europe.

== Distribution ==
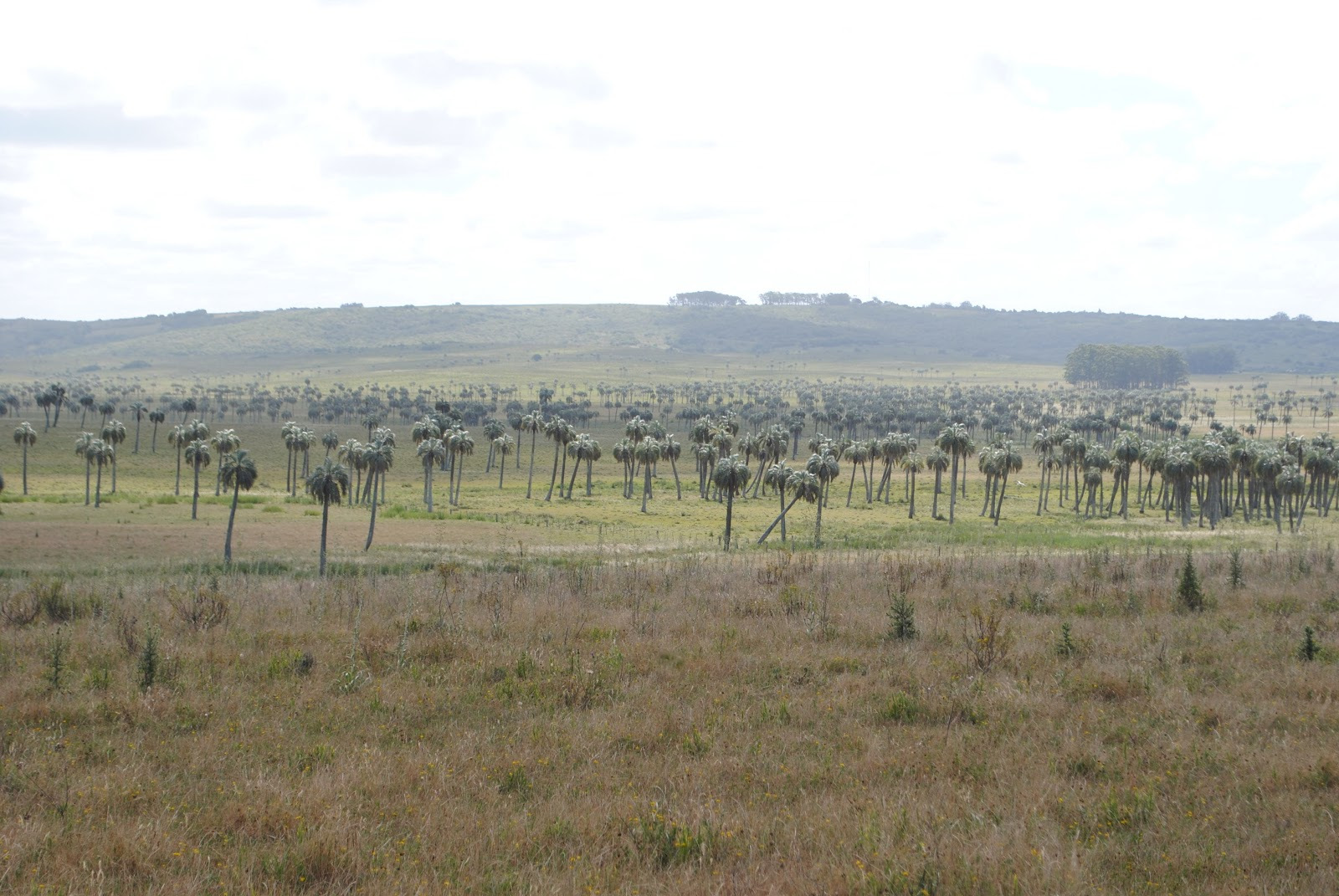
Palms growing in the wild in Cañada del Paso del Bañado near the Laguna Negra, Palmares de Castillos, Rocha Department, Uruguay.

It is native to southern Rio Grande do Sul in Brazil, from the municipalities of Palmares do Sul and Porto Alegre south to Treinta y Tres and Rocha Department in northern Uruguay.

Bauermann et al. investigated the possibility of using palm pollen, including this species, in palynology, in order to try to provide more detail about the ancient changes in habitat in the state Rio Grande do Sul in Brazil by tracking the changes in distribution and abundance of the palms, but were unable to provide much detail on the subject.

=== Habitat ===
It is distributed in a band along the coast of southernmost Brazil, extending into Uruguay. In this region it is found in restinga habitat in fields on top of the hills hugging the coast. It may also occur in grasslands (pampa), seasonally semi-deciduous Atlantic forest, and rocky outcrops. It grows in sandy and rocky soils which are often dry, such as stabilised dune formations. It does not occur in more humid habitats. It commonly is found growing in small aggregated clusters; these palm groves are known locally as butiazais or butiatubas. It grows from 0-500m in altitude.

=== Non-native distribution ===
Despite being extensively planted in several areas across southern Europe, the United States, and elsewhere, this species is rarely recorded as escaping from gardens or naturalising.

In 2000 in Flora of North America Scott Zona stated that B. odorata showed little inclination for escaping cultivation, but as of 2018 the USDA PLANTS database has it as naturalized in the states of Florida, North and South Carolina of the United States.

In 1996 the unpublished Flora of the Carolinas and Virginia, used as the reference in the PLANTS database, stated the species (as B. capitata) to be present in coastal North and South Carolina. In 2004, 2005 & 2008 the same flora, expanded to Georgia by 2004 and northern Florida in 2008, stated that this palm (as B. capitata) is not naturalised in the region, but that it is widely planted along the coastal strip of southeastern North Carolina, eastern South Carolina, eastern Georgia and northern Florida, and that these garden plants often persist despite neglect and can appear naturalised in superficially semi-natural locations. In 2018 the first instance of this palm (now identified as B. odorata) naturalising in this region was published, based on specimen vouchers collected in 2007 from young plants some distance from human habitation in Camden Co., in the far southeast corner of Georgia.

By at least 2009 an anonymous source considered this palm naturalised in Florida and it was included in the USDA PLANTS database. In 2010 this opinion was validated when the first instance of a naturalised palm was published, recording a 2005 collection of a specimen in the dunes of the Chinsegut Wildlife and Environmental Area in Hernando Co., a former farm and estate with some plantings of Butia palms. Another instance of this palm naturalising was recorded in literature (no voucher) in 2013 in Silver River State Park, Marion Co. As of 2018, the Atlas of Florida Plants shows voucher specimens (identified as B. capitata (with a caveat)) have been collected in the central and northern counties of Hernando, Volusia, Washington, Liberty, Gadsden, Leon and Wakulla.

== Ecology ==
Butia odorata frequently serves as a host for the epiphyte fig species Ficus cestrifolia (locals sometimes believe that fruit from these trees is much more sweet). It is also host to two lichens: Cladonia ahtii and C. palmicola. C. palmicola was first collected in 1989, described in 1995, and as of 2012 has only been found on the trunks of Butia trees growing along the coast from Santa Catarina State to Uruguay.

Butterfly caterpillars recorded feeding in Uruguay in 1974 on this palm (B. odorata identified as Syagrus capitata in this study) are Blepolenis batea and Opsiphanes invirae, either the nominate form or possibly subspecies remoliatus.

The caterpillars of the Indonesian butterfly Cephrenes augiades augiades and the Australian C. trichopepla may also feed on the leaves this palm.

== Uses ==
=== In prehistory ===
Around 4750 BC, as the climate started to dry out for a prolonged period, an agricultural civilisation began to develop in the extensive wetlands around Merín Lagoon in Rocha department, Uruguay, as evidenced today by thousands of mounds, known as cerritos, strewn over the landscape. These peoples lived in sedentary villages that accumulated household refuse such as broken tools, stone flakes, shells, pieces of charcoal or bone, other remains of foods, and pottery sherds and graves in a later archaeological stage, eventually forming mounds, which during a later stage were expressly enlarged and heightened with such materials as burnt termite mounds and gravel. These people survived on a diet based on some hunting and fishing along with the cultivation of maize and gourds, and later beans, and collection of tuberous marsh plants such as Typha, Canna, Marantha and Araceae. Nuts and phytoliths of Butia odorata are abundant here in association with the traces of human occupancy from even before the first evidence of the adoption of agriculture throughout many millennia of the mound-builder villages, thus indicating that the fruit and fronds were used, but it is unclear if the nearby palm groves were wild, cultivated or encouraged to spread (either by design or not).

Around approximately AD 0 a new people moved into the north of this region from the Amazon, the ancestors of the Tupi-Guaraní peoples, who initially settled in the dense woodland along the margins of the larger rivers, where they practised slash-and-burn agriculture using crops such as cassava, peanuts, gourds, beans, potatoes and sweet potatoes. These peoples lived in sedentary to semi-permanent villages of numerous family longhouses arranged in circles around the centre, and had a culture including managing fallow lands for further agricultural production, wearing lip discs, ritual anthropophagic feasts with fermented beverages, long distance trade using roads, exclusive use of bark for fuel in pottery kilns and funerary hearths, and cremation with the remains buried in urns in the village centre. Nuts of B. odorata have been found in the remains of such a village dating from 1460–1800 AD.

=== As an ornamental ===
B. odorata is frequently grown in Mediterranean Europe, the southern USA, Australia and southern Brazil as an ornamental garden plant.

It is notable as one of the hardiest feather palms, sometimes tolerating brief drops in temperature down to about −10 °C at night; it is often cultivated in subtropical climates. In Europe, this palm can be found close to the Mediterranean, though some specimens are cultivated as far north as southern U.K. In the United States, B. odorata is grown along the West Coast from San Diego to Seattle, and along the East Coast from Florida to Virginia Beach. In climates in the far north, such as the coastal areas of the Netherlands it is advised to plant the palms in full sunlight.

Larger specimens are said to take −10 to −12 °C, but should be protected at −5 °C, for example by wrapping heating strips around the trunk. It should be protected from excess rain during the winter, for example with a small, open tent. The substrate should be very porous so that water drains away from the roots quickly. In the summer this palm demands lots of water and should be watered regularly. It is possible to harvest fruit in as far north as the Netherlands.

=== As food ===
It is cultivated as a fruit tree in Brazil and Uruguay, and especially the larger-fruited, semi-domesticated, pulposa-type plants are reasonably common in local orchards.

In the type most often grown in the USA, the ripe fruit are about the size of large cherry, and yellowish/orange in colour, but can also include a blush towards the tip. The taste is a mixture of pineapple, apricot, and vanilla. Taste can vary depending on soil conditions, and the tastes of apple, pineapple, and banana together is also common. It is tart and sweet at the same time, with a flesh similar to a loquat, but slightly more fibrous.

== Chemistry ==
The triterpenes cylindrin and lupeol methyl ether can be isolated from Butia odorata leaf epicuticular waxes.

== Conservation ==
Noblick in 1996 notes that the population he visited growing in a cattle pasture that had once been restinga was unhealthy as there was no recruitment (growth of new individuals). Rejuvenation of the population was hindered by fires and cattle grazing. Noblick also notes that much of its former habitat was being converted to rice fields.

As of 2018 the conservation status has not been evaluated by the Centro Nacional de Conservação da Flora in Brazil.

As of 2017, like all four species of Butia native to Uruguay, it is protected by law. Adult palms may not be felled or moved without government permission.

== Gallery ==
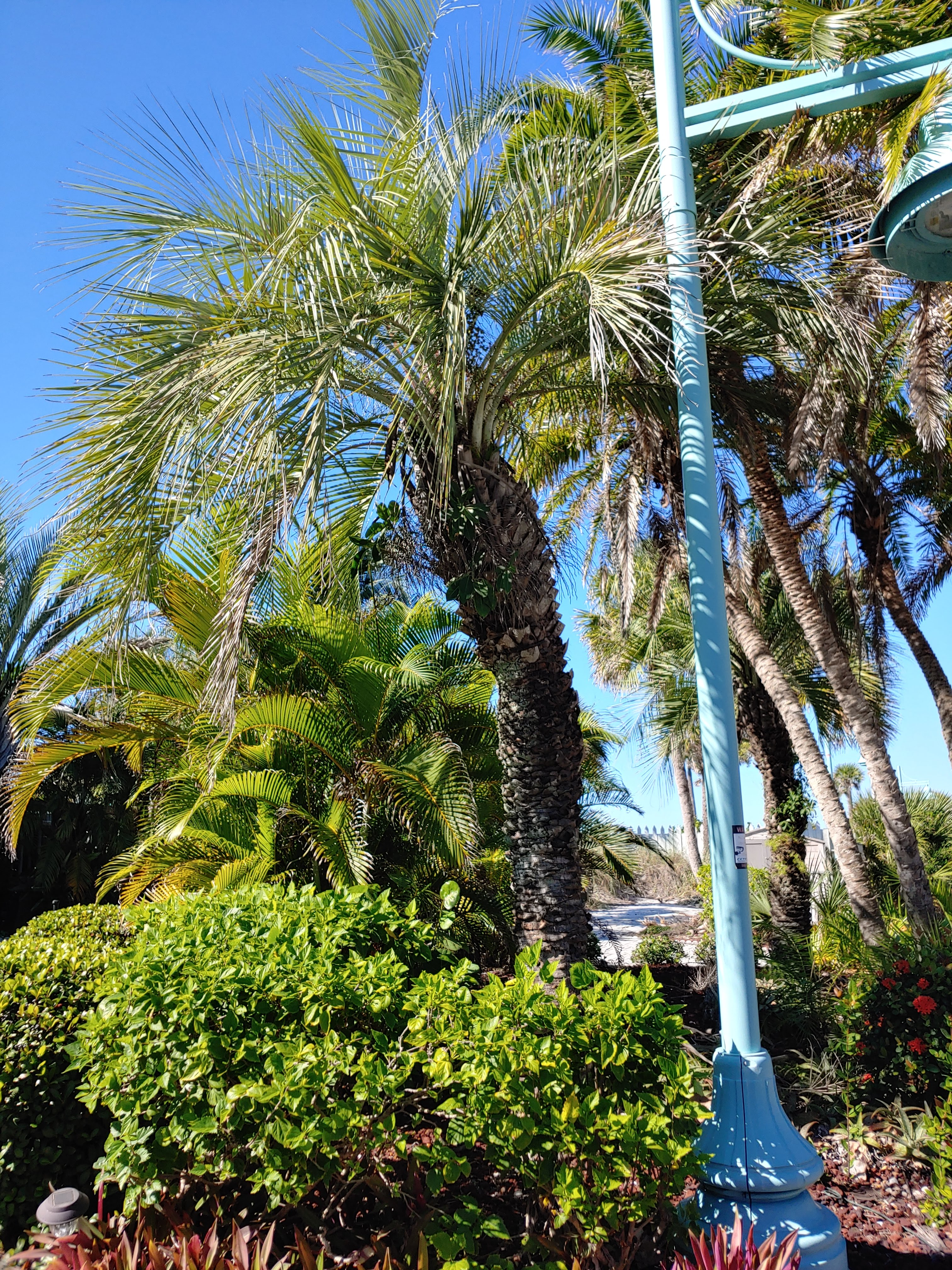
Butia Capitata in Englewood Florida.

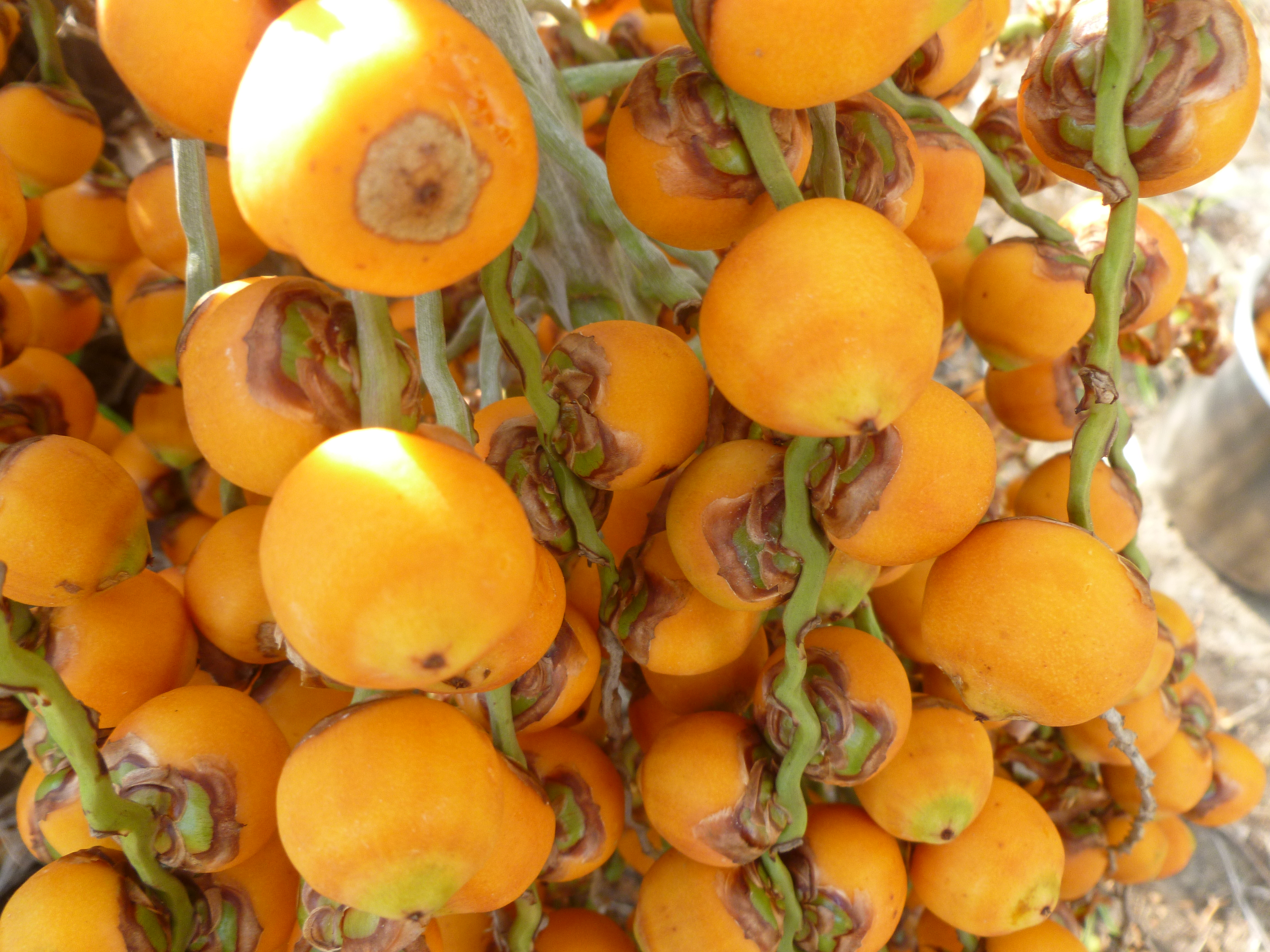
Ripe fruit of Butia odorata palm growing in Ocean Isle Beach.

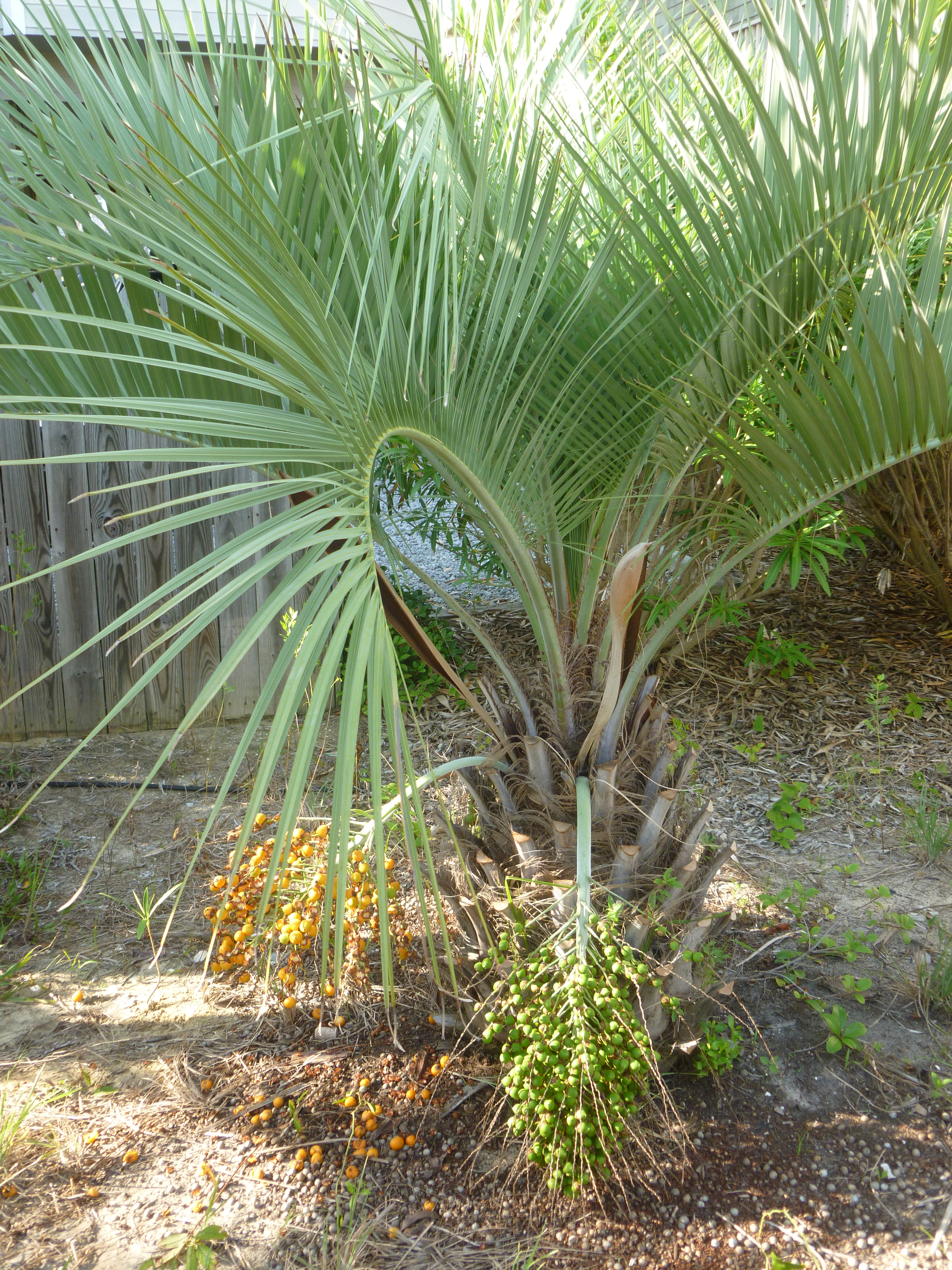
Butia odorata palm growing in Ocean Isle Beach, bearing both ripe and unripe fruit.

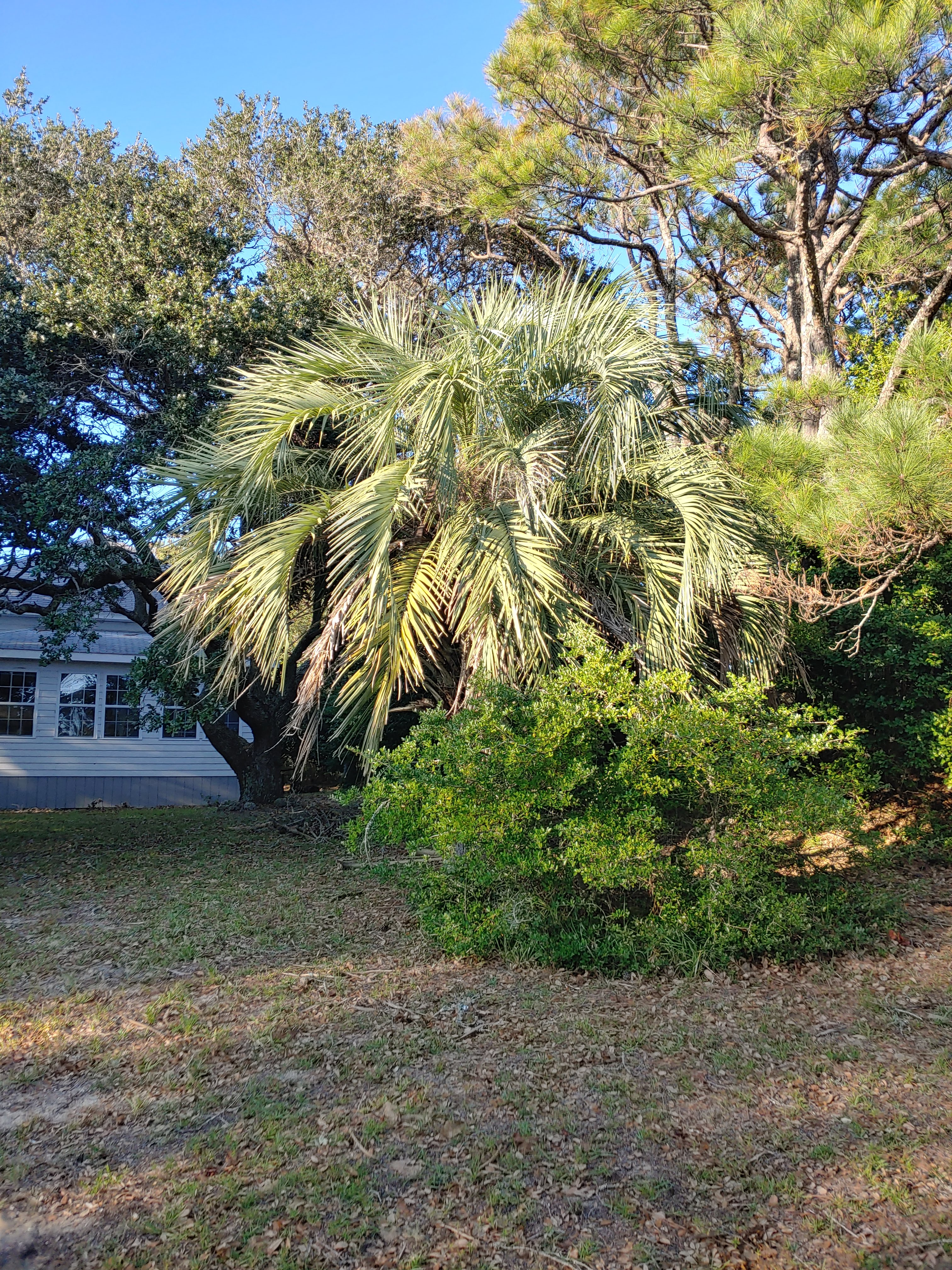
Butia Capitata in Buxton North Carolina.

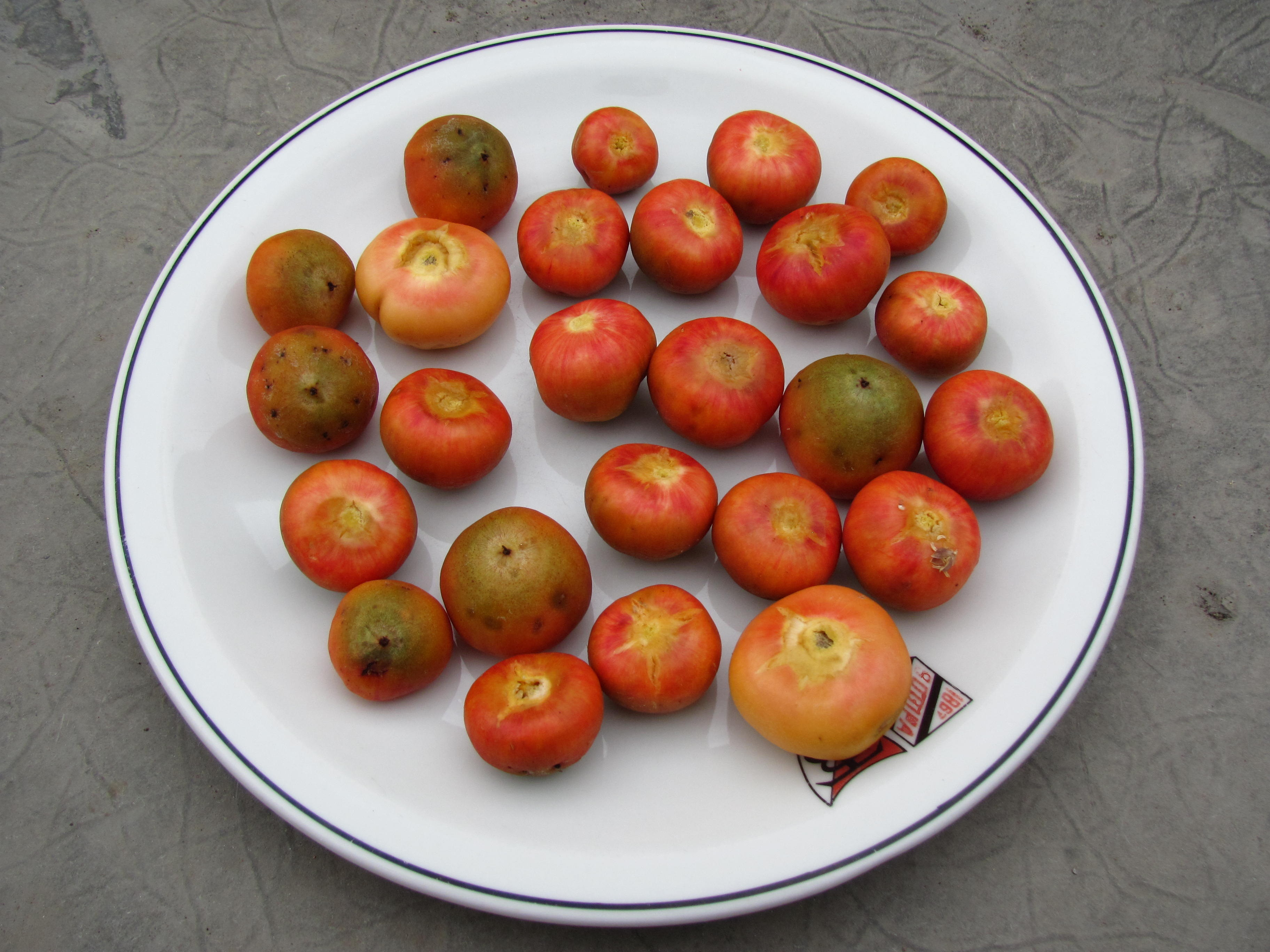
Fruit collected from a tree in Sertão Santana, Rio Grande do Sul, Brazil.

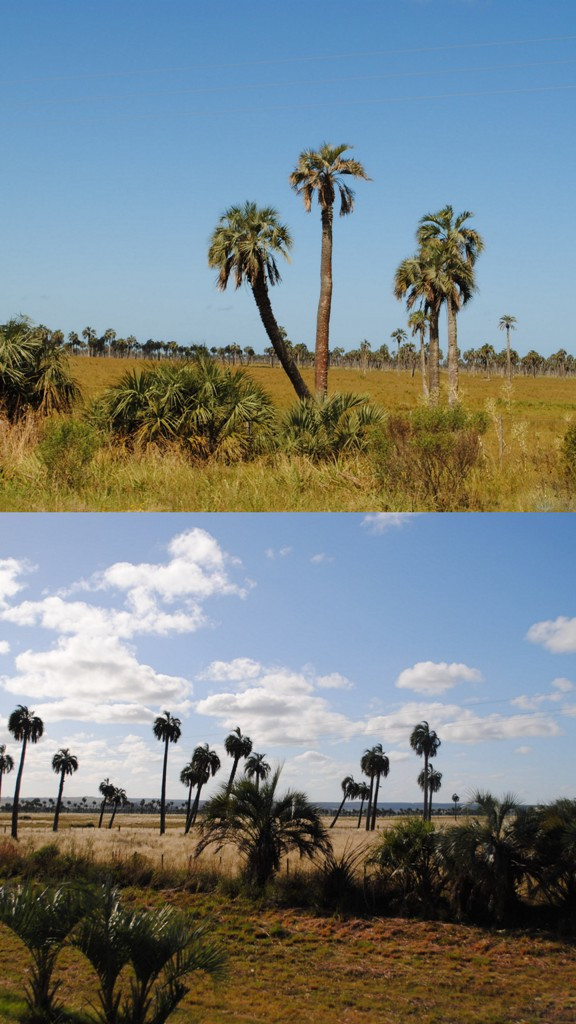
A grove near Laguna Negra, Palmares de Castillos, Rocha Department, Uruguay.

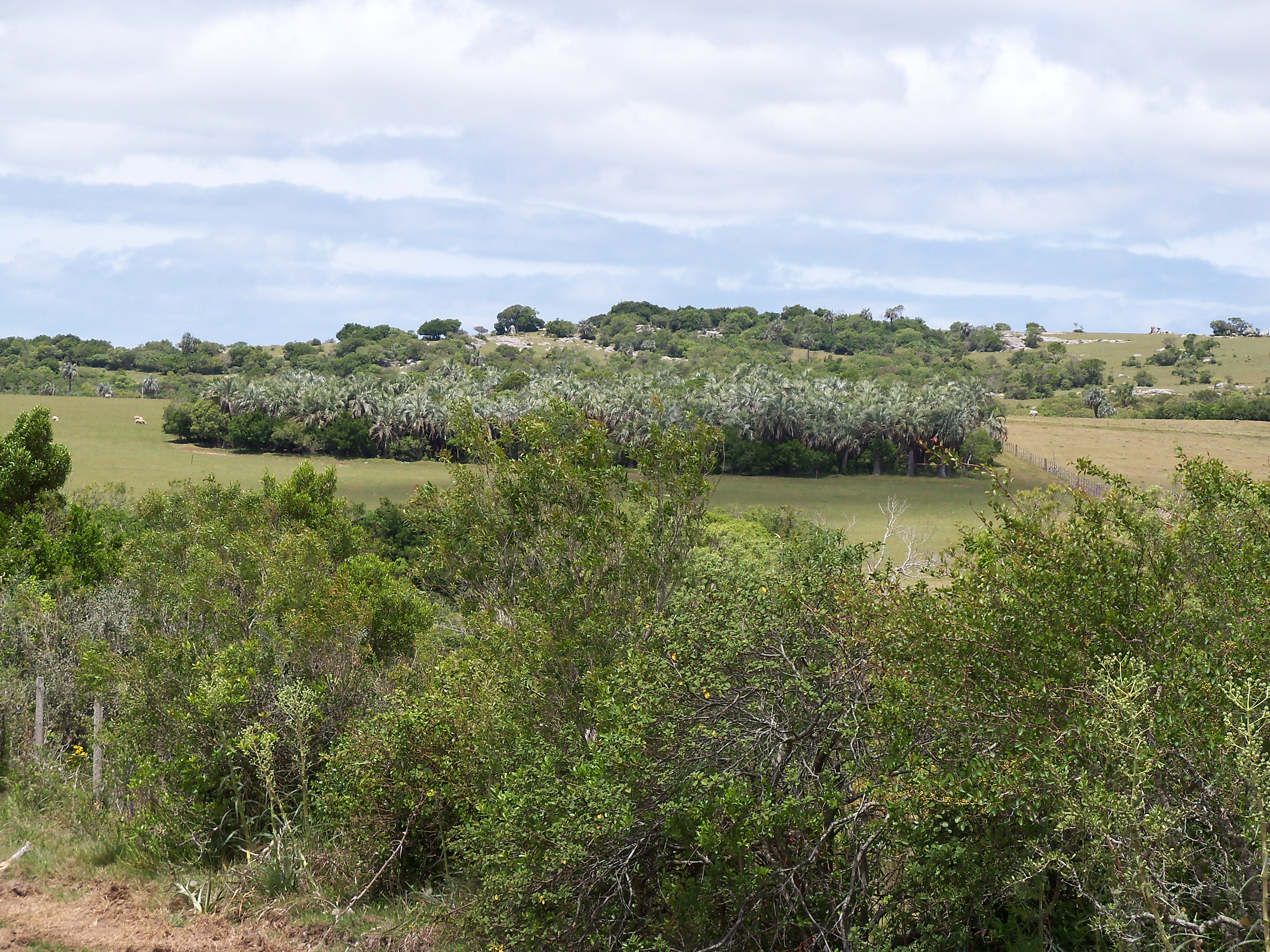
A thick grove of old trees at Palmar de tiburcio, Camino del Indio, Rocha, Uruguay.

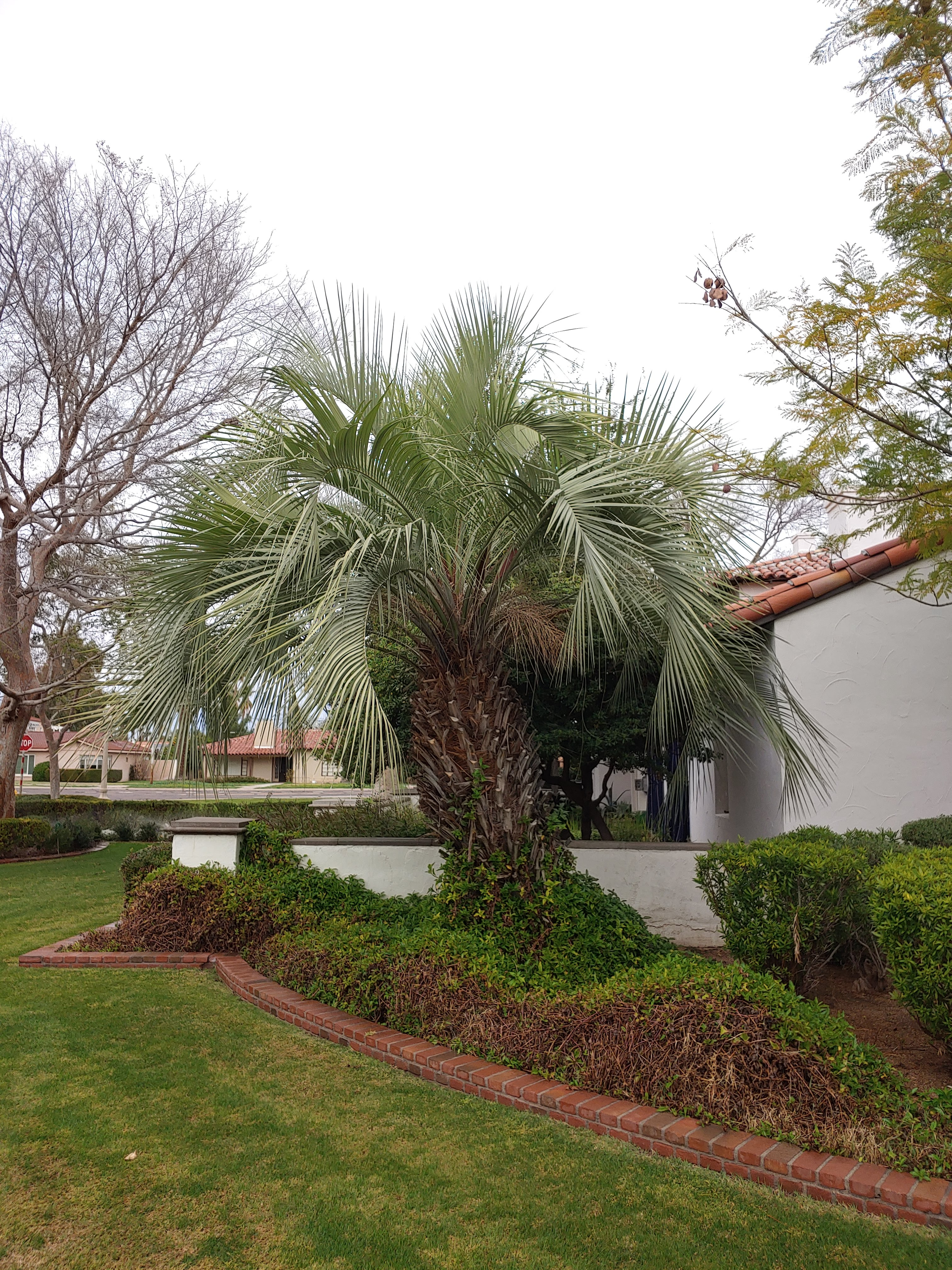
Butia Capitata in Phoenix Arizona.
