= Butia microspadix =

Scientific classification
- Kingdom: Plantae
- Clade: Tracheophytes
- Clade: Angiosperms
- Clade: Monocots
- Clade: Commelinids
- Order: Arecales
- Family: Arecaceae
- Genus: Butia
- Species: B. microspadix

Binomial name
- Butia microspadix Burret [1930]

Synonyms
- Syagrus hatschbachii Glassman [1967]

Species of palm

Butia microspadix is a very small species of grass-like Butia palm usually with an underground trunk; native to the states of Paraná and São Paulo in Brazil.

It has been given the common name dwarf woolly jelly palm in English. It is locally known as butiazinho-do-campo or just butiazinho in Portuguese. The species epithet is derived from ancient Greek μικρός (mikrós), meaning 'small', and σπάδῑξ (spā́dīx), originally meaning 'palm frond' but referring to the inflorescence.

== Taxonomy ==
It was first described in Berlin in 1930 by Max Burret on the basis of two specimens collected in the 19th century in Brazil; one collected by Friedrich Sellow^{[a]} in São Paulo, the other by the cartographer Joseph Keller in Paraná. He also cited another specimen collected by the entomologist Hermann Luederwaldt to the south of São Paulo (no. 12267), which he mentioned was extremely close to the species as he described it. These specimens were all believed to be destroyed in 1943 during World War II by a fire caused by allied bombing. The fire also destroyed the records of where duplicates had been sent.

In 1967 Sidney Fredrick Glassman described Syagrus hatschbachii as a new species from specimens collected by G. Hatschbach^{[b]} in Paraná State in 1961, but after publishing his article, he discovered an old specimen from Luederwaldt (no. 12267) in the herbarium of São Paulo which had been determined as Butia microspadix by Burret. In 1968 he published his opinion that, although it appeared to be the same as the specimens of Syagrus hatschbachii he had, as Luederwaldt's specimen was of an immature plant he thus could not be certain it was the same. As he found the specimen did not match Burret's description to his "satisfaction", he considered Burret's Butia microspadix to be a species incerta. He repeated this in 1970, but in 1979, after having studied additional specimens, he changed his mind and concluded that these two taxa were indeed the same.

== Description ==
Butia microspadix is usually acaulescent, but may sometimes, rarely, develop a tiny trunk of up to 20–30 cm, and 10 cm diameter. It rarely exceeds 60 cm in total height including the leaves, growing to a maximum height of 90 cm. It is always solitary-trunked. It is very slow growing. It very much resembles a tuft of grass.

The 3-10 leaves are pinnate and coloured greyish-green. The 13–20 cm long leaf petiole is spineless, bearing only some fibres along the margins at the base. The petiole is 0.4-0.6 cm wide and flat on top but rounded elsewhere. The rachis is 30–74 cm in length. The 15-29 pinnae (leaflets) on each side of the leaf rachis are linear with an acuminate apex and inserted at a regular distance on the same plane per side of the leaf, so that each pair of pinnae forms a neat 'V'-shape. These pinnae are 13–40 cm long and 0.3-0.8 cm wide in the middle of the rachis.

Similarly to B. eriospatha, it has woody spathes (in which the young inflorescence is developing) with the outside surface densely covered in a furry layer of lanate (woolly) tomentose indumentum; these differ from the spathes of that species by the hairs being shorter and darker purplish-brown. The spathe is 33–40 cm in length, with an enlarged part 10–18 cm long and 3.5-4.5 cm wide.

The inflorescence is branched and up to 17 cm long. The inflorescence has a 27–32 cm peduncle and a lanceolate prophyll 7–14.5 cm long. The rachis of the inflorescence is 1–7.5 cm long and has 3-18 rachillae (branches) which are 6–12 cm long. The flowers are coloured yellow. The staminate (male) flowers are 5-7mm in length; the pistillate (female) flowers are 4–5mm in length.

The shape of the fruit is ellipsoid (like an elongated acorn with a small cap/base, or a rugby ball with one end flat); but shape of the nut is globose (round). The fruit are 1.5–2 cm long by 1–2 cm wide, generally a bit longer than wide, with a juicy flesh. The fruit have been described as coloured brown, or, when ripe, violet or greenish-yellow, and covered in a rusty-coloured fur. The nut is hard, 1.1-1.5 cm in diameter, has 1-2 seeds within, and contains a homogeneous endosperm.

=== Similar species ===
It is easily told apart from other miniature species of Butia by its densely furry spathes, with the hairs being woolly and persistent (not easily rubbed off). With its petioles lacking teeth along the margin it is most similar to B. archeri according to Glassman in 1979, although a number of other dwarf species lacking teeth have been discovered since then.

It grows in the same region as the extremely rare B. pubispatha, another dwarf, grass-like species described as a new species in 2010. This species also has petioles lacking teeth and furry spathes, but its spathe has shorter, more pubescent hairs which can be rubbed off, and is also somewhat robuster and larger in size. B. pubispatha also grows much faster.

B. eriospatha can also be found growing in this region.

== Distribution ==
The species is mostly restricted to eastern highlands of the state of Paraná, with small populations in the south of São Paulo state. As of 2017, it has been recorded from only ten localities. Within Paraná it occurs in the municipalities of Antônio Olinto, Carambeí, Jaguariaíva, Palmeira, Ponta Grossa, Sengés and Tibagi. Within São Paulo it occurs in the municipalities of Paranapanema and Itararé. Within the extent of occurrence, an area of approximately 6000 km^{2}, it is calculated to occupy some 1300 km^{2} (the area of occupancy), giving it an abundance of 21%, which is reasonably low compared to other species of Butia.

The specimen Luederwaldt no. 12267 Burret cited in 1930 was collected, according to him, in Raiz da Serra (in modern Cubatão), São Paulo, but the no. 12267 specimen Glassman had found in the late 1960s in the herbarium of São Paulo was labelled as being collected in Rio Grande do Sul, thus Glassman concluded that the two specimens might not be the same, despite bearing the same collection numbers. Because of this, Glassman concluded that Butia microspadix was native to the states of Rio Grande do Sul and Paraná, and possibly São Paulo if one accepted Burret's description (he apparently didn't read Burret's statement that the Sellow collection was also likely made in São Paulo).

Because of the belief that this species was found in Rio Grande do Sul, a number of sources also state that it (probably) occurs in Santa Catarina state, which lies between Rio Grande do Sul and Paraná, although it has never been seen there.

In 2014, however, Soares et al. and a curator of the São Paulo herbarium, Maria Mamede, pointed out that Luederwaldt had never been to Rio Grande do Sul, and spent his time in Brazil exclusively collecting in the vicinity of São Paulo, which meant that the specimen had simply been mislabelled.

== Habitat ==
It is found in dry grasslands or steppes known as campos gerais, where its unassuming habitus and thin leaflets makes it difficult to find camouflaged amongst the grass. It may also sometimes be found growing on rocky outcrops.

It grows in full sun and in a red clay soil amongst thick campos vegetation. It shares its range and habitat with another dwarf palm; Allagoptera leucocalyx. It grows in an area that often sees heavy downpours (in the summer), and moderate frosts in winter. It has been recorded growing at altitudes of 790-920m.

Its habitat is severely fragmented.

== Ecology ==
It fruits in the summer. The fruits were found in abundance in the faeces of the crab-eating fox (Cerdocyon thous, 27% of total mass) and the maned wolf (Chrysocyon brachyurus, 28% of total mass).

Bees visiting the flowers in Vila Velha State Park in Ponta Grossa, Paraná, include Ceratalictus clonius, Ceratalictus stigon, Ceratalictus sp. and Dialictus spp.. The Dialictus spp. were only found on Butia microspadix.

== Uses ==
It is collected by palm enthusiasts as an ornamental plant and seed has sometimes been available from specialist retailers since at least 2015, if not earlier. It is said to be very ornamental. It is difficult to germinate, the seeds having low viability and taking more than 6 months to germinate. It is very slow-growing. USDA hardiness zone 9b. It is advised to plant the palms in full sunlight. It is said to take −5 °C, but should be protected at 0 °C in the Netherlands.

== Conservation ==
In 1979 Glassman claimed that the species appeared to be quite abundant in Paraná, apparently based on comments by Hatschbach.

In 1995 the Secretaria de Estado do Meio Ambiente of the state of Paraná, in partnership with the Deutsche Gesellschaft für Technische Zusammenarbeit (a German foreign development agency), rated the species as 'rare' in the state of Paraná. In 2008 the species was rated as 'data deficient' by the Ministério do Meio Ambiente of the federal government. In 2012 the Centro Nacional de Conservação da Flora rated the conservation status for Brazil as 'vulnerable', primarily due to habitat loss due to the pressure of agricultural expansion (although the actual extent of loss was yet unclear at the time). In a 2017 dissertation by Marcelo Piske Eslabão the species is said to ought to be considered 'vulnerable' as the IUCN categories B1ab (i, ii, iii) and B2ab (i, ii, iii) applied; this means that the extent of occurrence and area of occupancy (see distribution above) were below a certain threshold, and that according to Eslabão the population was in decline.

Its habitat is severely fragmented. According to Alberto Leonardo Barkema, a Brazilian expert in palm horticulture, in 2009, agriculture (soya, wheat, cattle pasture) has so decimated the remaining habitat, that this palm can usually only be found in the verges of natural vegetation in the berm along the edges of roads. According to him it is being out-competed in such areas by more vigorous invasive species, notably grasses such as Pennisetum purpureum and those of the genus Brachiaria, as well as Eucalyptus and Pinus elliottii. Nigel Kembrey, an English specialist in Butia horticulture, seconds this, calling it "extremely rare and threatened".

It is one of the most protected Butia species, being present in at least six conservation areas: the Nascentes do Paranapanema State Park, Vila Velha State Park, Cerrado State Park, Guartelá State Park, and Parque Ibiti. At Represa Alagados in Ponta Grossa, Paraná, it also grows on the grounds of a hydroelectric facility.

== Hybrids ==
In horticulture, F1 and even F2 hybrids have been created with Butia eriospatha.

== Notes ==
^{a} ^{b} Sometimes misspelled in works by Glassman.
