= Lorenzia =

Scientific classification
- Kingdom: Plantae
- Clade: Tracheophytes
- Clade: Angiosperms
- Clade: Monocots
- Order: Alismatales
- Family: Araceae
- Subfamily: Aroideae
- Tribe: Spathicarpeae
- Genus: Lorenzia; E. G. Gonç.
- Species: L. umbrosa

Binomial name
- Lorenzia umbrosa E. G. Gonç.

Genus of flowering plants

Lorenzia is a genus of plants in the family Araceae, first described in 2012. It has only one known species, Lorenzia umbrosa, endemic to Amapá state in north-eastern Brazil.

== Etymology ==
The name of the genus comes from the surname of the Brazilian agronomist and botanist Harri Lorenzi, to whom Eduardo G. Gonçalves paid homage.
