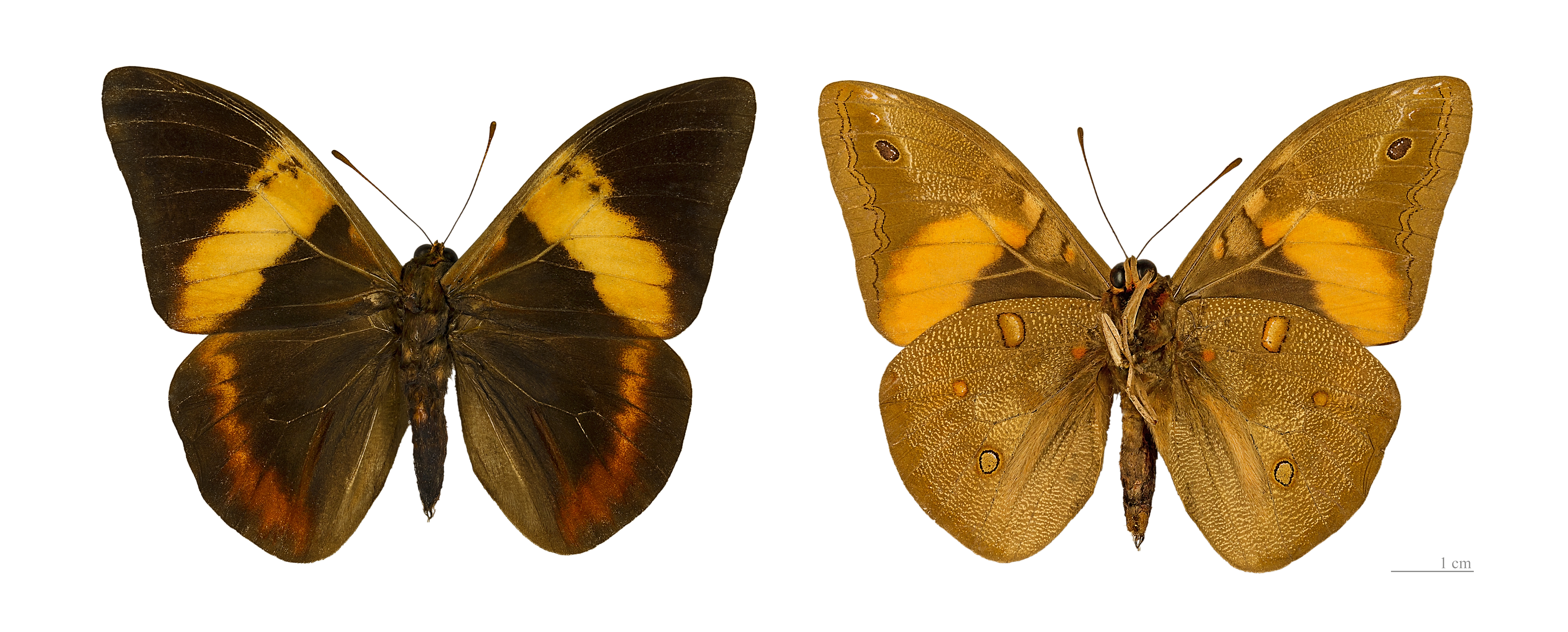
- Male
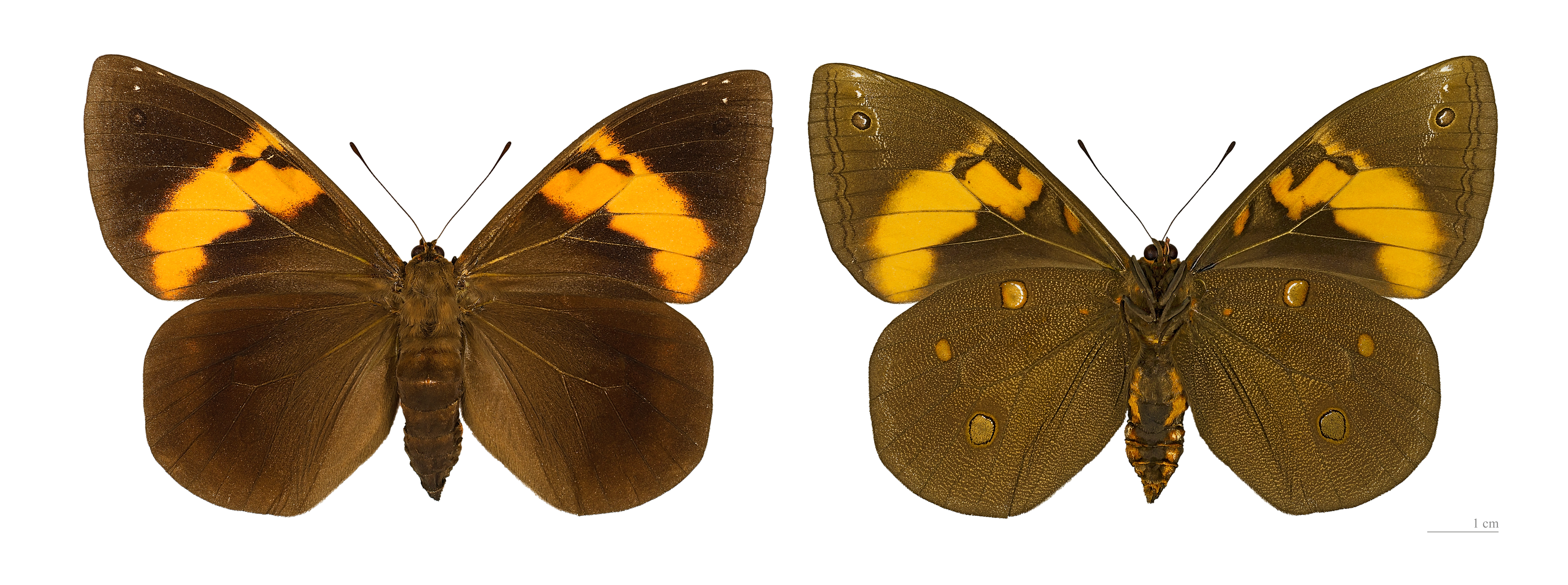
- Female

Scientific classification
- Kingdom: Animalia
- Phylum: Arthropoda
- Clade: Pancrustacea
- Class: Insecta
- Order: Lepidoptera
- Family: Nymphalidae
- Genus: Brassolis
- Species: B. sophorae

Binomial name
- Brassolis sophorae (Linnaeus, 1758)

Synonyms
- Papilio sophorae Linnaeus, 1758; Brassolis sophorae romani Bryk, 1953

= Brassolis sophorae =

Species of butterfly

Brassolis sophorae, commonly known as the coconut caterpillar, is a species of large butterfly in the family Nymphalidae. It is found in South America.

== Description ==
Adults have a wingspan of 70 to 105 mm.

== Hosts ==
The larvae are considered pests, and feed on a wide range of plants, including Acrocomia aculeata, Archontophoenix alexandrae, Arecastrum romazoffianum, Astrocaryum, Attalea, Bactris (including Bactris major), Butia eriospatha, Caryota mitis, Caryota urens, Chrysalidocarpus lutescens, Cocos nucifera, Copernicia cerifera, Desmoncus, Euterpe, Hyophorbe lagenicaulis, Livinstona chinensis, Mauritia flexuosa, Neodypsis decaryi, Orbignya, Phoenix canariensis, Phoenix dactylifera, Phoenix reclinata, Pritchardia pacifica, Ptychosperma macarthurii, Roystonea oleracea, Roystonea regia, Roystonea venezuelana, Sabal mauritiiformis, Sabal umbraculiferus, Scheelea macrocarpa, Washingtonia filifera, Saccharum officinarum, Musa sapientum, Ravenala madagascariensis and Strelitzia nicolai.

== Subspecies ==
- Brassolis sophorae sophorae
- Brassolis sophorae ardens Stichel, 1903 (Peru, Ecuador)
- Brassolis sophorae dinizi d'Almeida, 1956 (Brazil: Paraíba)
- Brassolis sophorae laurentii Stichel, 1925
- Brassolis sophorae luridus Stichel, 1902 (Colombia)
- Brassolis sophorae vulpeculus Stichel, 1902 (Paraguay)
- Brassolis sophorae philomela Stichel, 1925 (Ecuador)
