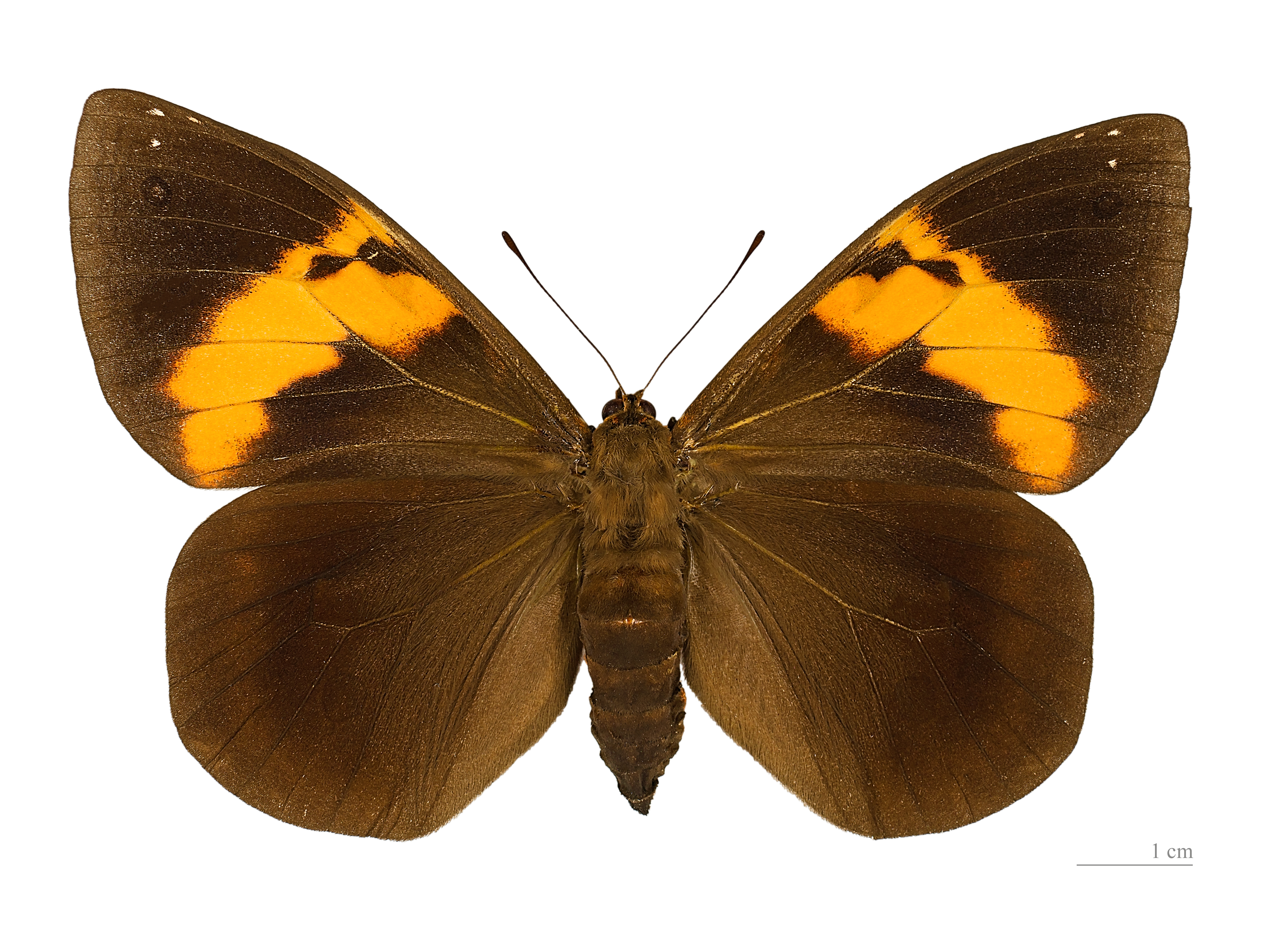
- Brassolis sophorae

Scientific classification
- Domain: Eukaryota
- Kingdom: Animalia
- Phylum: Arthropoda
- Class: Insecta
- Order: Lepidoptera
- Family: Nymphalidae
- Tribe: Brassolini
- Genus: Brassolis; Fabricius, 1807

= Brassolis =

Genus of brush-footed butterflies

Brassolis is a genus of Neotropical butterflies in the family Nymphalidae.

== Species ==
- Brassolis astyra Godart, [1824]
- Brassolis haenschi Stichel, 1902
- Brassolis isthmia Bates, 1864
- Brassolis sophorae (Linnaeus, 1758)
