= Sertão Santana =

Municipality of Rio Grande do Sul, Brazil

- Municipality
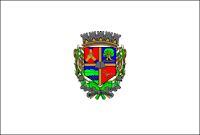
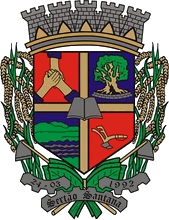
- Flag Coat of arms

- Location within Rio Grande do Sul

- Location in Brazil
- Coordinates: 30°27′36″S 51°36′10″W
- Country: Brazil
- State: Rio Grande do Sul

Population (2020)
  - Total: 6,537
- Time zone: UTC−3 (BRT)

Sertão Santana is a municipality in the state of Rio Grande do Sul, Brazil. Sertão Santana é um município brasileiro no estado do Rio Grande do Sul, localizado a cerca de 80 km de Porto Alegre. A cidade possui aproximadamente 5,8 mil habitantes (IBGE/2022) e destaca-se pela forte presença da agricultura familiar.

== See also ==
- List of municipalities in Rio Grande do Sul
