= Água Clara =

- Municipality
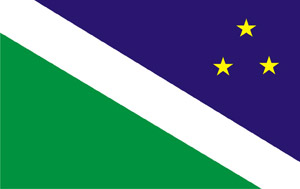
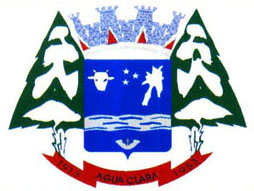
- Flag Coat of arms

- Location in Mato Grosso do Sul state

- Location in Brazil
- Coordinates: 20°26′52″S 52°52′40″W
- Country: Brazil
- Region: Central-West
- State: Mato Grosso do Sul

Government
  - Mayor: Edvaldo Queiroz - Tupete (PDT, 2017 - 2020)

Area
  - Total: 11,031 km^{2} (4,259 sq mi)

Population (2020)
  - Total: 15,776
  - Density: 1.4302/km^{2} (3.7041/sq mi)
- Time zone: UTC−4 (AMT)

Água Clara is a municipality located in the Brazilian state of Mato Grosso do Sul. Its population was 15,776 (2020) and its area is 11,031 km^{2} (4,259 sq mi).

== Geography ==
The municipality of Água Clara is located in the south of the Midwest region of Brazil. It is located at latitude 20º26'53 ” south and longitude 52º52'40” west. It has just over 14,000 inhabitants. It is 204 km from the state capital (Campo Grande) and 868 km from the federal capital (Brasília).
