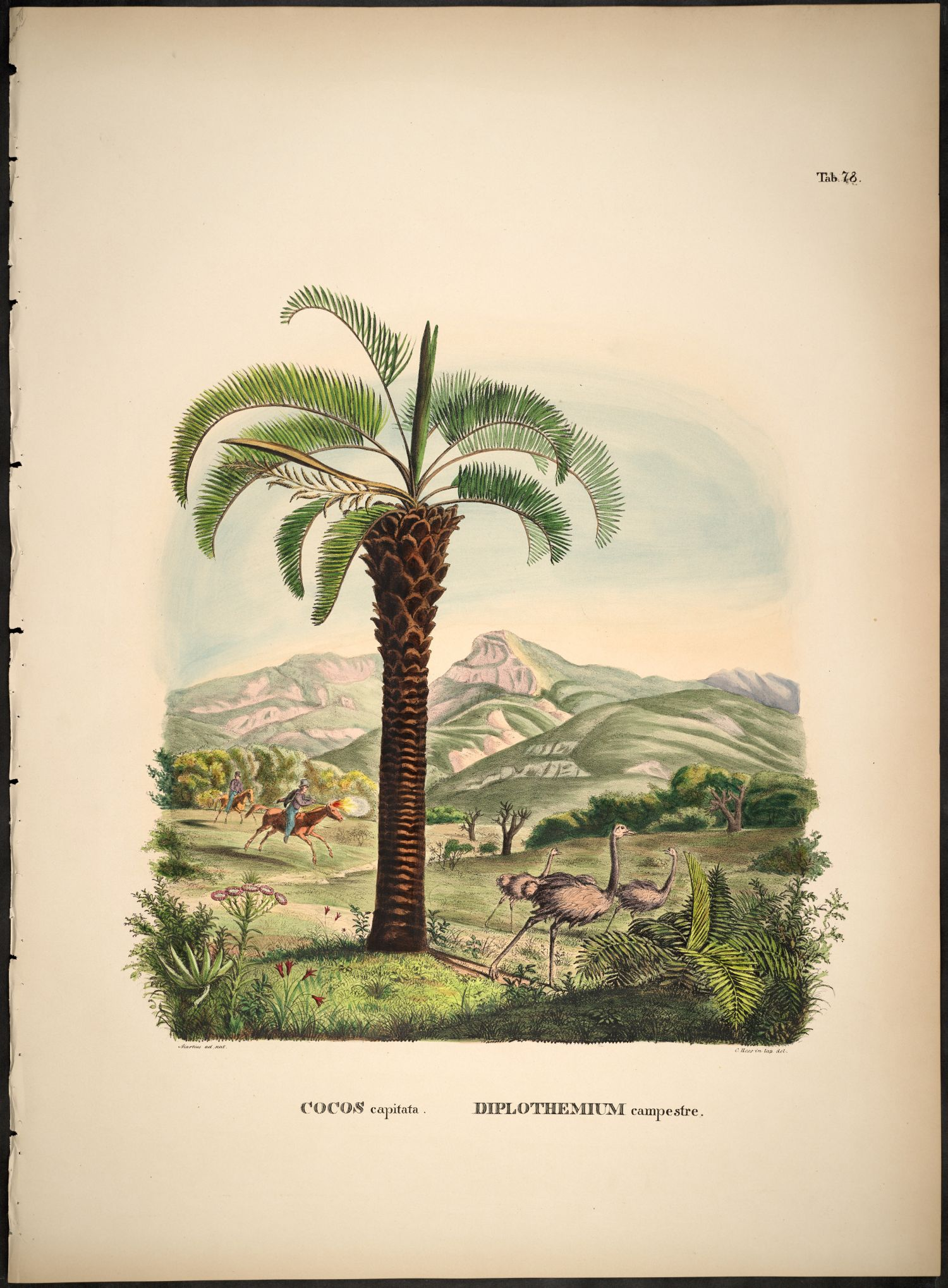
- First illustration, the lectotype.
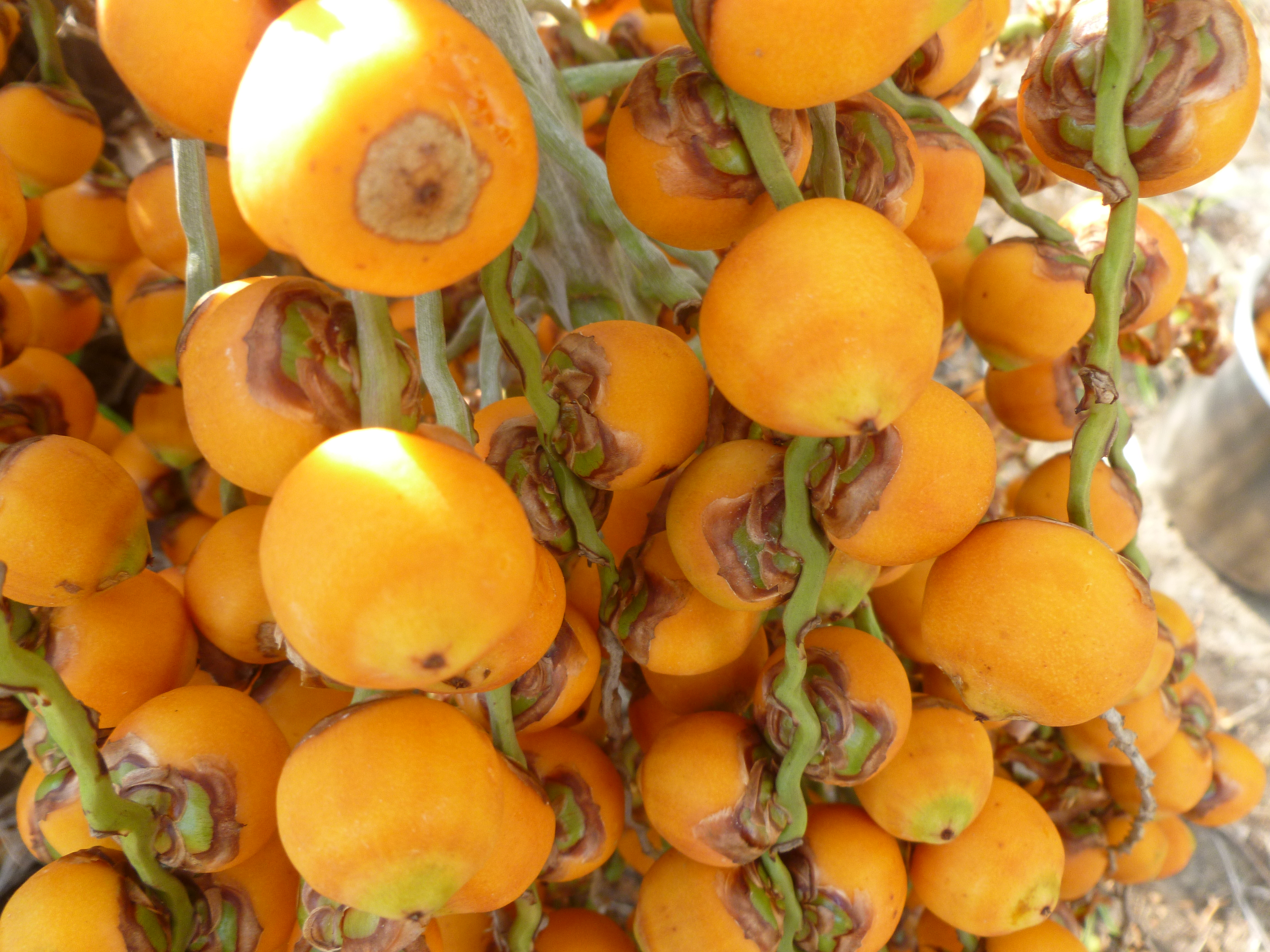
- Ripe fruit

Scientific classification
- Kingdom: Plantae
- Clade: Embryophytes
- Clade: Tracheophytes
- Clade: Angiosperms
- Clade: Monocots
- Clade: Commelinids
- Order: Arecales
- Family: Arecaceae
- Genus: Butia
- Species: B. capitata

Binomial name
- Butia capitata (Mart.) Becc.

Synonyms
- Cocos capitata Mart. [1916]; Calappa capitata (Mart.) Kuntze [1891]; Butia capitata subsp. eucapitata Herter, not validly publ. [1940]; Syagrus capitata (Mart.) Glassman [1970]

= Butia capitata =

Species of palm

Butia capitata, is known as Cocus Capitata and also known as jelly palm, is a Butia palm native to the states of Minas Gerais and Goiás in Brazil.

== Description ==
This palm grows up to 8–10 metres (26–33 ft) tall. It has feather palm pinnate leaves that arch inwards towards a thick stout trunk.

In Minas Gerais, it flowers from May to July and is in fruit from November to February. Ripe fruit are about the size of large cherry, and yellowish/orange in color, but can also include a blush towards the tip.

=== Similar species ===
Palms cultivated around the world under the name Butia capitata are actually almost all B. odorata. The real B. capitata is not notably hardy, nor widely cultivated.

== Taxonomy ==
This taxon was first scientifically described in 1826 as Cocos capitata in the Historia Naturalis Palmarum by Carl Friedrich Philipp von Martius, who described and illustrated the palm from sketches and herbarium collections he made on montane grasslands near the Serra de Santo Antônio, Minas Gerais.

In 1970, Sidney Fredrick Glassman moved this species, along with all other Butia, to Syagrus, but in 1979 he changed his mind and moved everything back.

== Distribution and habitat ==
The plant is native to Brazil, in the states of Minas Gerais and Goiás. It is known locally as coquinho-azedo or butiá in (northern) Minas Gerais.

== Uses ==
The fruits are locally harvested from the wild between November and February to make juices, liquor, marmalades and ice-cream. The fruit has orange, sometimes red, skin. The pulp is bright orange, highly aromatic, somewhat oily, and quite fibrous. The pulp can be frozen for industrial production. In the north of Minas Gerais state, B. capitata juice has been added to some public school lunches.

An oil can be extracted from the nuts which is quite similar to coconut oil.

=== Nutrition ===
The pulp is a good source of β-carotene and provitamin A compared with other fruits usually consumed. A glass of juice containing 100g of B. capitata pulp can provide 40% of the daily vitamin A requirements for children aged under eight by the standards of the National Academy of Medicine.
