= Harri Lorenzi =

Brazilian agronomic engineer

- Born: 1949 (age 76–77)
- Education: Federal University of Paraná; University of Tennessee
- Notable work: Brazilian Trees
- Scientific career
- Fields: Agronomy

Harri Lorenzi (born 1949) is a Brazilian agronomic engineer and writer on trees of the Atlantic Mata. He is a collaborating agronomist of the garden of Fazenda Cresciumal, Ruy De Souza Queiroz. He published four books in the late 1990s: Brazilian palms, Brazilian Trees (both also published in English), Tropical Plants of Burle Marx and Brazilian Ornamental Plants.

In 2012, botanist E. G. Gonç.named Lorenzia, a genus of plants in the family Araceae, after him.
