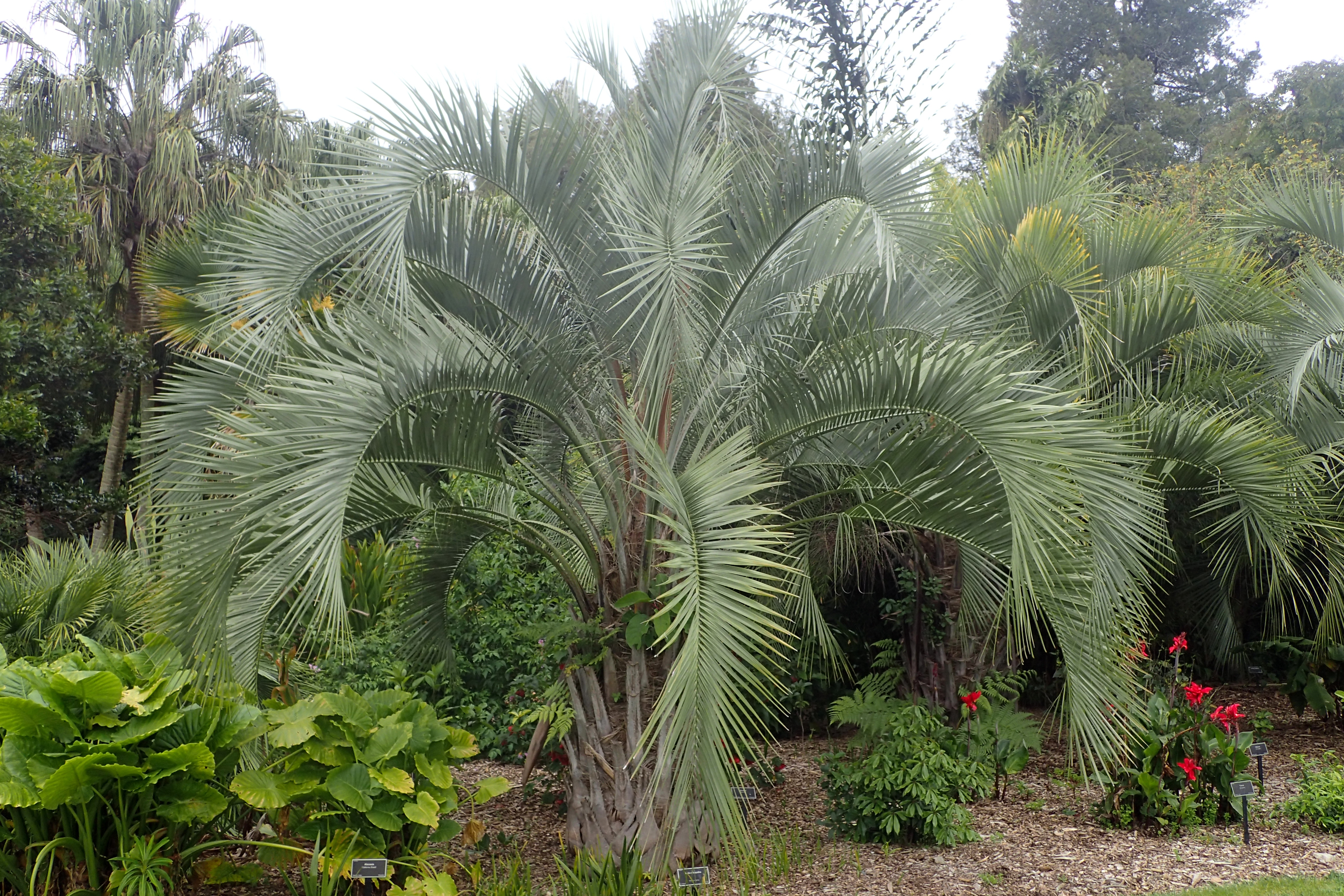
- Butia eriospatha in the Auckland Botanic Gardens

Conservation status
- Vulnerable (IUCN 2.3)

Scientific classification
- Kingdom: Plantae
- Clade: Tracheophytes
- Clade: Angiosperms
- Clade: Monocots
- Clade: Commelinids
- Order: Arecales
- Family: Arecaceae
- Genus: Butia
- Species: B. eriospatha

Binomial name
- Butia eriospatha (Mart. ex Drude) Becc.

Synonyms
- Cocos eriospatha Mart. ex Drude [1881]; Calappa eriospatha (Mart. ex Drude) Kuntze [1891]; Syagrus eriospatha (Mart. ex Drude) Glassman [1970]; Butia punctata Bomhard [1942], nom. nud.

= Butia eriospatha =

Species of palm

Butia eriospatha is a small species of Butia palm endemic to the highlands of southern Brazil. It is very similar to B. odorata, but is easily distinguished from this species by the distinct spathes which are densely covered in rust-coloured, woolly hairs. Indeed, the specific epithet is derived from Greek ἔριον, wool, and Latin spatha, which refers to the spathe. It has been given the name woolly jelly palm (UK) or wooly jelly palm (US) in English. Vernacular names for it where it is native are butiá-da-serra, butiázeiro, butiá-veludo, butiá butiá verdadeiro, butiá-do-campo, yatáy and macumá.

== Taxonomy ==
In 1970 Sidney Fredrick Glassman moved this species, along with all other Butia, to Syagrus, but in 1979 he changed his mind and moved everything back.

== Description ==
Butia eriospatha is a solitary-trunked palm tree. The trunk is sometimes inclined to a side, and may occasionally be subterranean. The 20-22 pinnate leaves arch back down towards the trunk and have a petiole armed with teeth spaced along their margins; the rachis of the leaf is 150–220 cm in length. The branched inflorescence develops in a woody, 115–135 cm long spathe covered in a dense woolly indumentum. The pistillate (female) flowers are 5–9mm in length. The shape of the fruit is globose (round), as is the shape of the nuts.

Like all species of Butia studied, this species has relatively larger pollen grains than that of other genera of palm present in Rio Grande do Sul, Brazil. These grains are bilaterally symmetrical, prolate-spheroid, monosulcate, and with the end piriform (pear-shaped). The surface is covered in minute 2μm-large reticulate patterns.

== Distribution ==
It is native to southern Brazil, where the main bulk of its population is found straddling the highlands in the eastern Santa Catarina/Rio Grande do Sul border regions, surrounded by scattered sub-populations in the southeastern coastal part of the high plateau of the states of Paraná, Rio Grande do Sul, and Santa Catarina. A naturalised population in an area of northern Misiones Province, Argentina, was reported in 2008.

Bauermann et al. investigated the possibility of using palm pollen, including this species, in palynology, in order to try to provide more detail about the ancient changes in habitat in the state Rio Grande do Sul in Brazil by tracking the changes in distribution and abundance of the palms, but were unable to provide much detail on the subject.

== Habitat and ecology ==
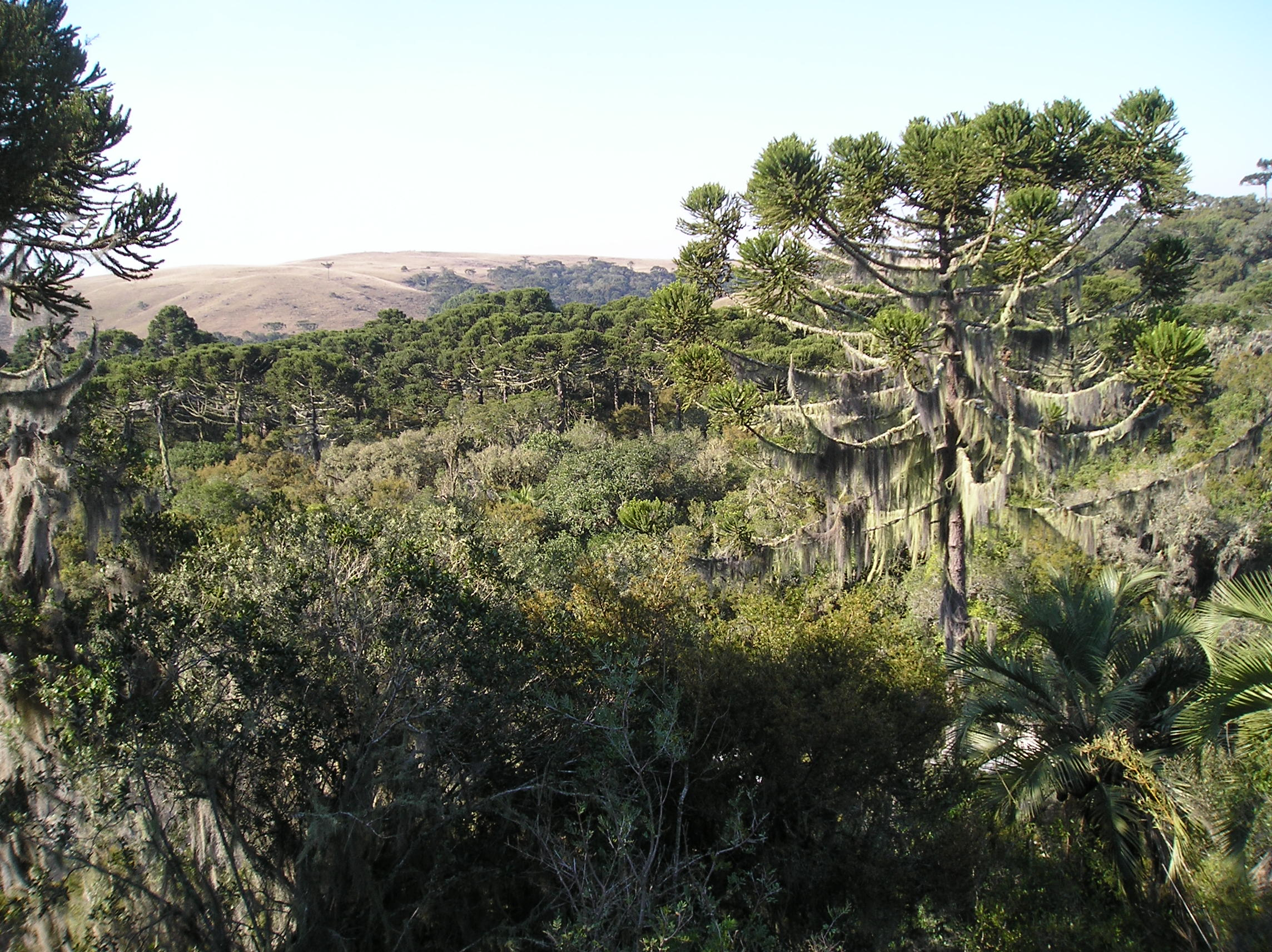
Butia eriospatha in its native habitat growing with Araucaria angustifolia in the Tainhas State Park.

It is found growing in the Atlantic rainforest biome on a plateau at higher altitudes, between 700 and 1,200m, where it is largely found in grasslands, aggregated in often extensive, dense, almost monoculture palm groves, but higher up also sometimes in open Araucaria forest.

These distinctive dense palm groves are known as butiázais in Rio Grande do Sul, but may also be known as butiatuba or butiazal.

The caterpillars of the butterflies Brassolis astyra ssp. astyra (fide d'Aralljo & Silva et al. [1968] (=record no. 2362, Butia eriospatha identified as butiázeiro or Cocos sp. in this study)) and B. sophorae (possibly ssp. dinizi) (=no. 2365) have been recorded feeding on B. eriospatha in Santa Catarina. Opsiphanes invirae, the nominate form or possibly subspecies remoliatus, was also recorded feeding on this palm in the same study (=no. 2390, 2392).

The caterpillars of the Indonesian butterfly Cephrenes augiades ssp. augiades may also feed on the leaves this palm.

Video of Anchylorhynchus eriospathae laying its eggs on the developing flowers of Butia eriospatha.

In a long term study observing the feeding behaviour throughout the year of the squirrel Guerlinguetus brasiliensis ssp. ingrami in secondary Araucaria angustifolia forest in the Parque Recreativo Primavera in the vicinity of the city of Curitiba, Paraná, of the ten plant species of which the squirrel ate the seeds or nuts, Butia eriospatha was an uncommon but regular part of the diet in the spring and summer. Mushrooms, seeds of Araucaria angustifolia, nuts of Syagrus romanzoffiana (queen palm) and acorns of Quercus robur (English oak) were the main part of the diet depending on the season.

== Uses ==
Butia eriospatha is reasonably available in Europe as an ornamental. It is often used in mild temperate climates as a hardy palm for its exotic look.

Products obtained from the palm are used locally and are not widely marketed. The fruit pulp is used as a base to make beverages. A wine is made from the palm, as are juices and jellies/jams.

Fibres were once harvested from this palm, which were used to make mattresses. Plantations of this palm were planted in the 1950s in Brazil for this purpose.

=== Horticulture ===
It is sometimes cultivated in Brazil and Argentina.

It is advised to plant the palms in full sunlight. It is said to take −14 °C, but should be protected at −6 °C in the Netherlands.

== Conservation ==
The species is widely cultivated, but according to Noblick in 1998, wild populations are declining. It was listed as em perigo (endangered) by the Rio Grande do Sul state government in 2002 (decreto nº 42.099) and 2014 (decreto n° 52.109), because the population is believed to have been reduced by over 50% in at least the last 100 years.

In 2012 the Centro Nacional de Conservação da Flora rated the conservation status for Brazil as 'vulnerable'.

== Gallery ==
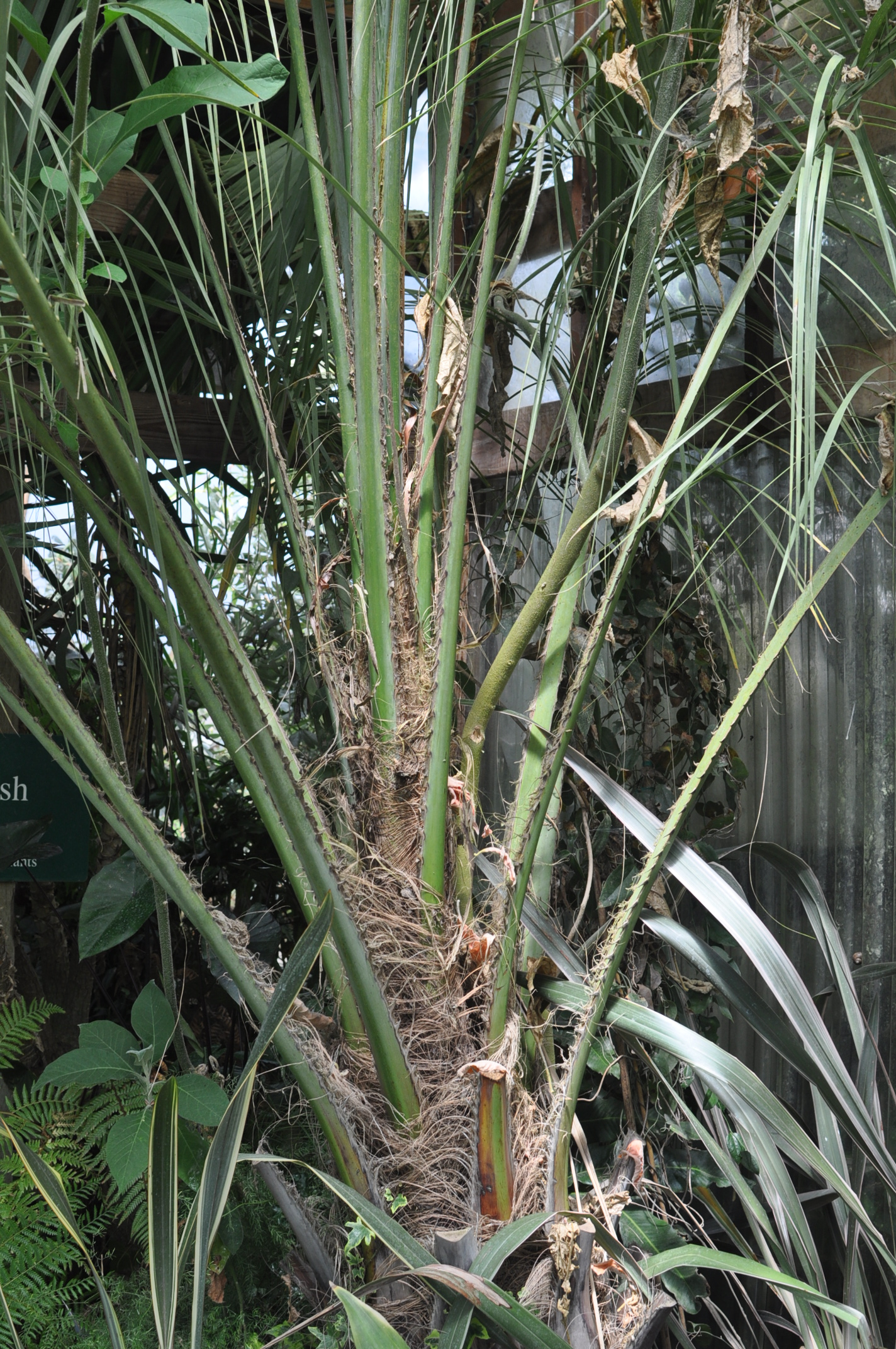
Note the teeth along the margins of the leaf petiole on this plant for sale in the USA.

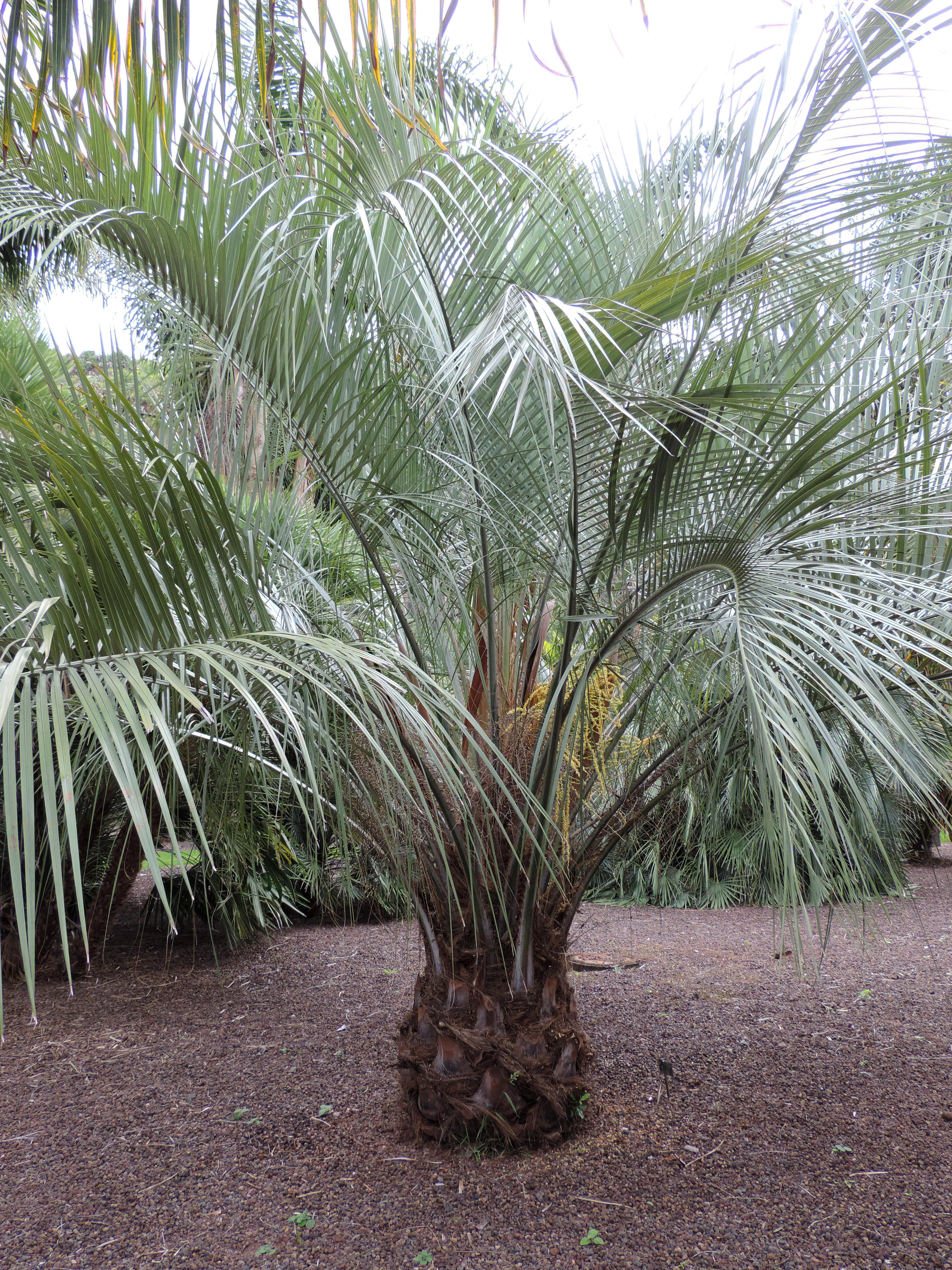
Young Butia eriospatha palm cultivated in the Jardín Botánico Canario Viera y Clavijo, flowering at the end of March.

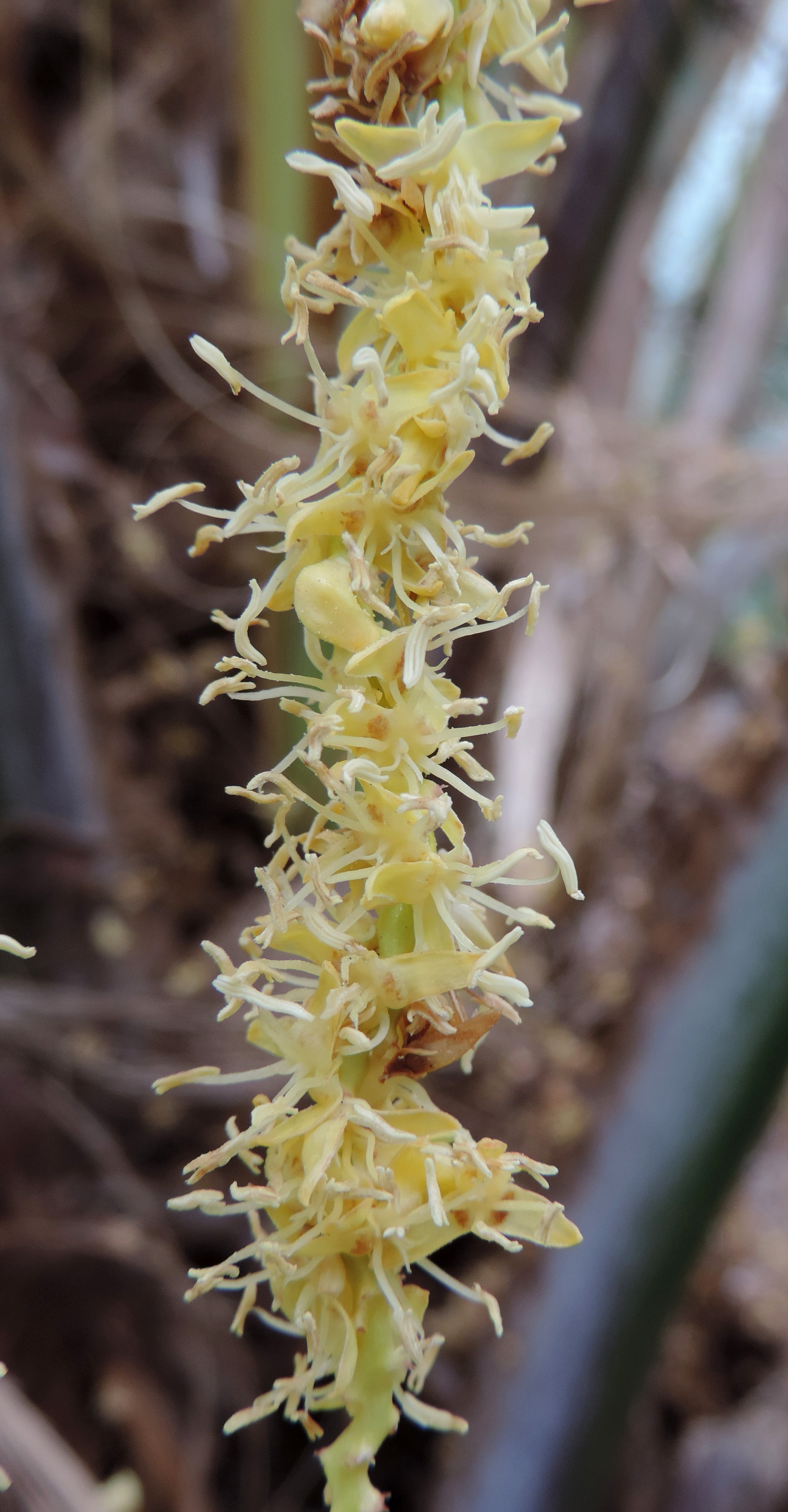
Flowers of B. eriospatha at the end of March at the Jardín Botánico Canario Viera y Clavijo.

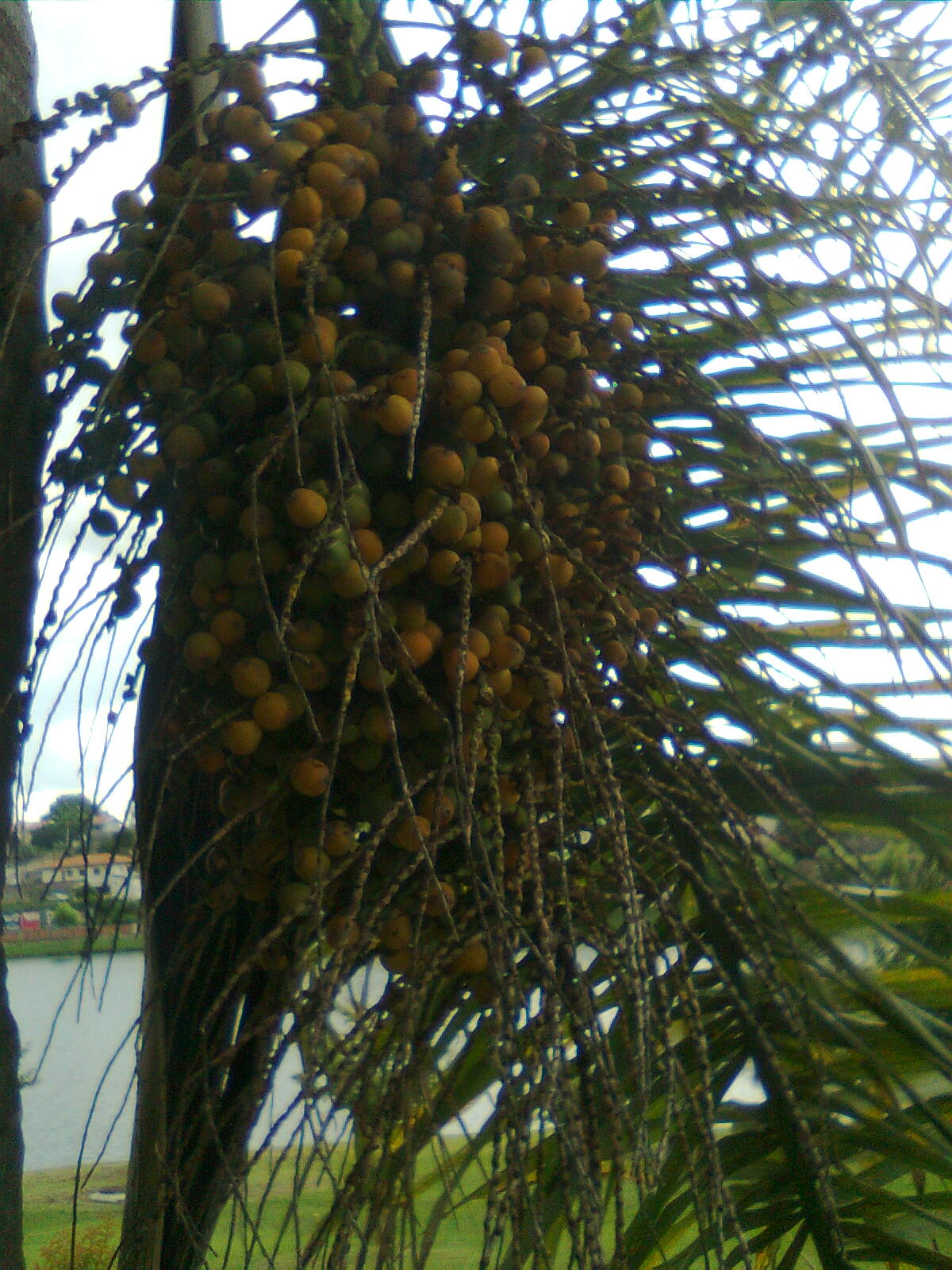
Ripe fruit in December (summer) in Brazil.

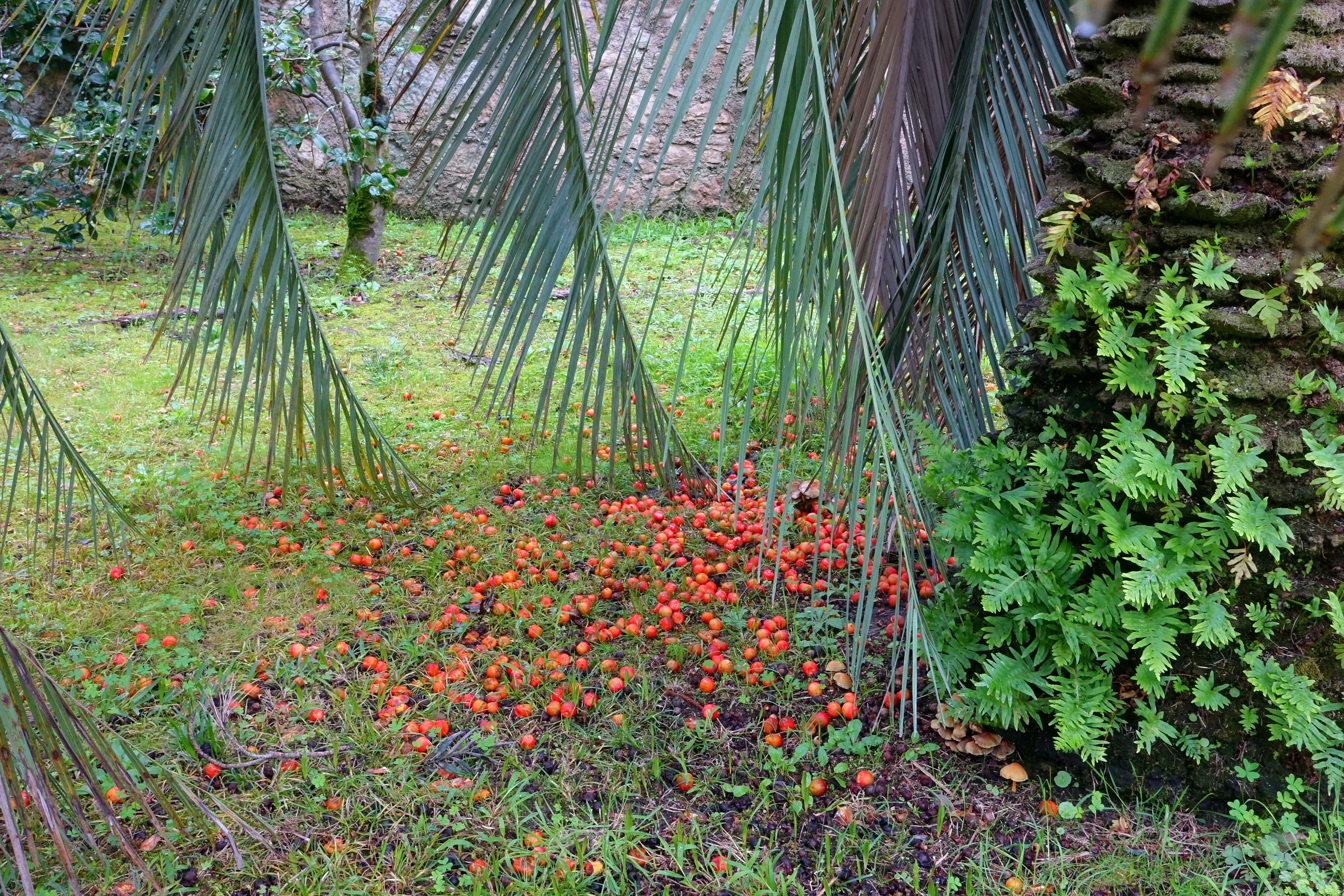
Fruit on ground after ripening, Botanical Garden of the University of Coimbra.

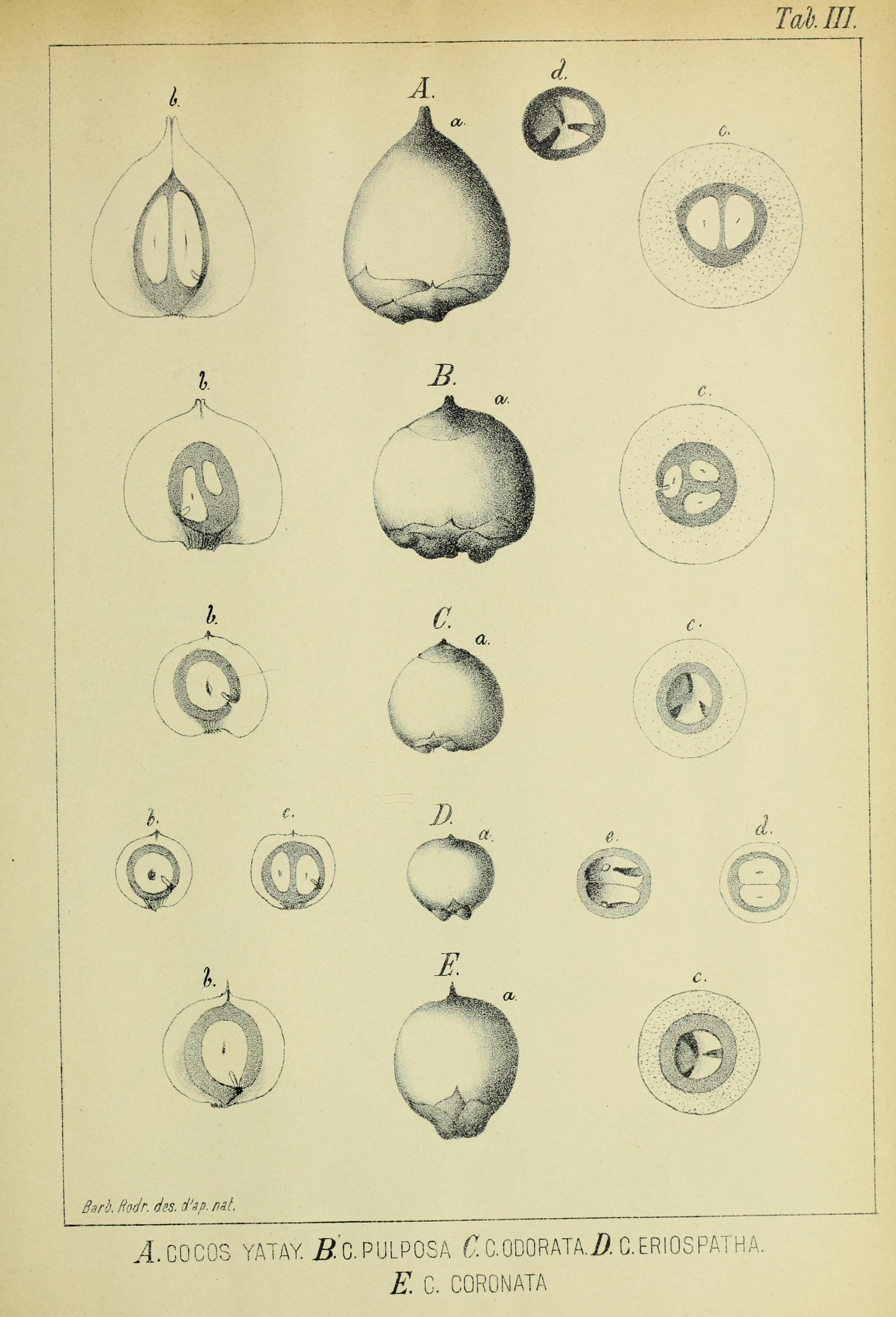
Comparison of fruit by João Barbosa Rodrigues in 1901. B. eriospatha is 'D' (note the smaller, very round fruit); B. yatay is 'A', B. odorata is 'B' & 'C', and Syagrus coronata is 'E'.
