= List of butterflies of Great Britain =

This is a list of butterflies of Great Britain, including extinct, naturalised species and those of dubious origin. The list comprises butterfly species listed in The Moths and Butterflies of Great Britain and Ireland by Emmet et al. and Britain's Butterflies by Tomlinson and Still.

A study by NERC in 2004 found there has been a species decline of 71% of butterfly species between 1983 and 2003. The 2007 UK Biodiversity Action Plan (BAP) listed 22 butterfly species. The 2011 Red List of British butterflies lists 4 species as "regionally extinct" (RE), 2 as "critically endangered", 8 as "endangered (E), 9 as "vulnerable" (V), 11 as "near threatened" (NT) and 28 as "least concern" (LC) in a UK context. In the list below, the categories are as taken from the 2022 Red List (RE 4, E 8, V 16, NT 5, LC 29). Range expansions according to the 2010 Atlas of Butterflies in Britain and Ireland.

Butterfly Conservation lists 29 of Great Britain's 58 breeding butterfly species as "High UK threat priority", with 9 of those with conservation priority status "Action urgent across UK range".

== Hesperiidae – skippers ==
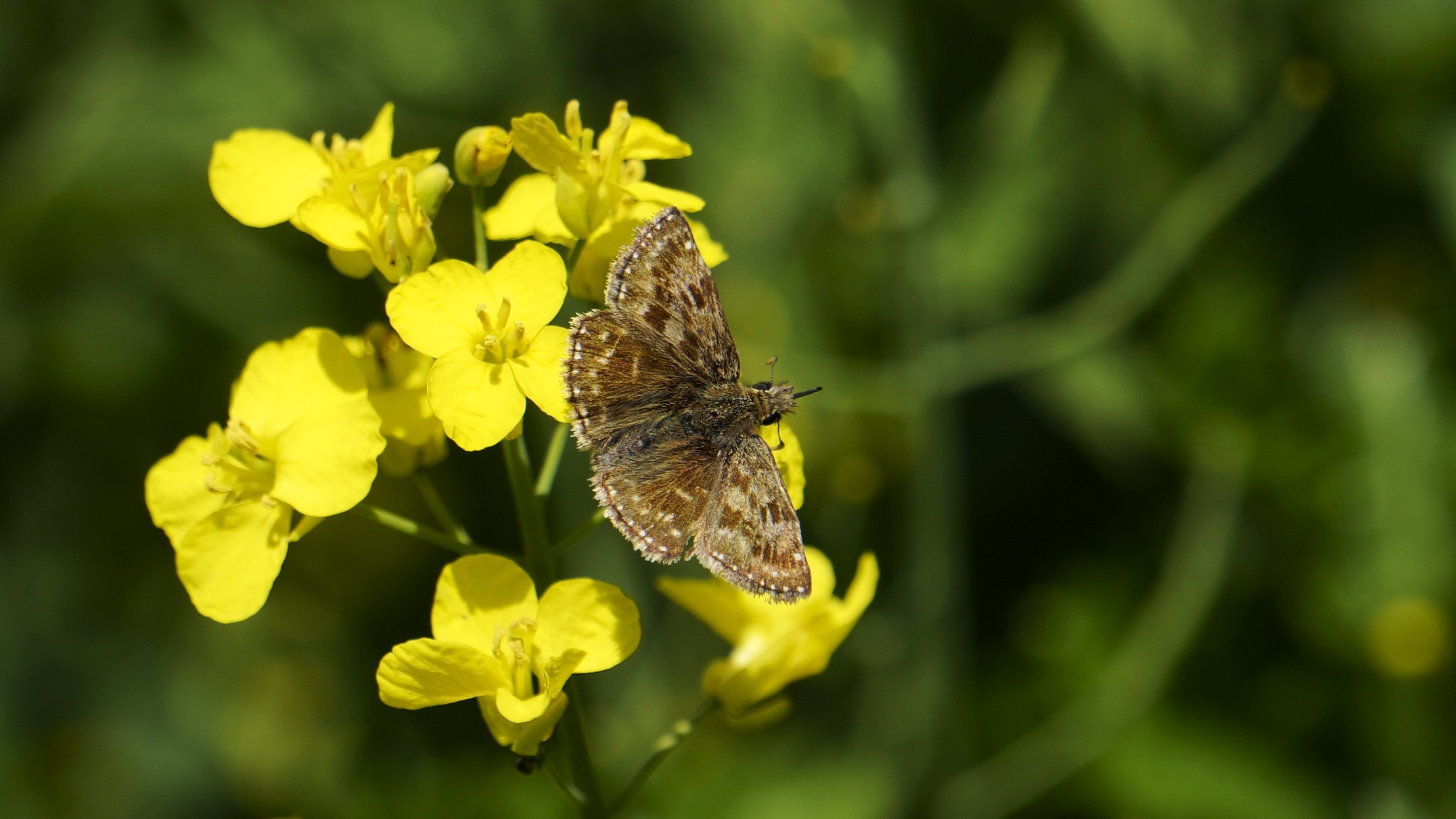
Dingy skipper

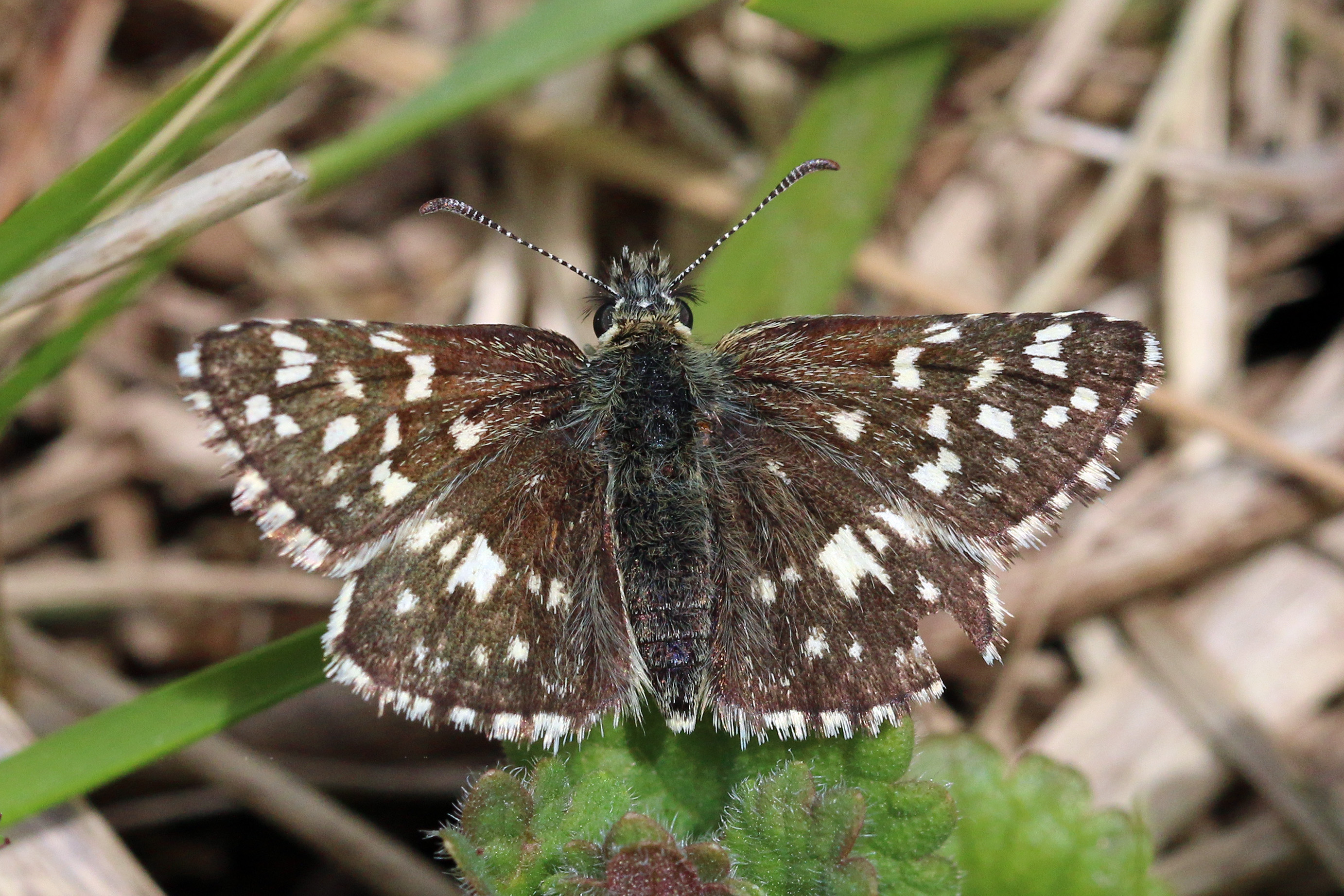
Grizzled skipper

Subfamily Heteropterinae

- Chequered skipper – Carterocephalus palaemon ^{LC}

– formerly thinly distributed in south and east, now confined to western Scotland; re-establishment project ongoing (2018–2020) Rockingham Forest, England

Subfamily Hesperiinae

- Small skipper – Thymelicus sylvestris ^{LC}

– throughout Wales and England, except far north-east and north-west; spreading north and west

- Essex skipper – Thymelicus lineola ^{LC}

– throughout south-east England, with scattered populations in West Country and as far north as the Humber estuary; spreading north and west

- Lulworth skipper – Thymelicus acteon ^{NT}

– confined to the south coast between Weymouth and Swanage

- Silver-spotted skipper – Hesperia comma ^{V}

– restricted to southern England: east Kent, east Sussex, Surrey, Hampshire, north Dorset, south Wiltshire and the southern Chilterns; expanding distribution

- Large skipper – Ochlodes sylvanus ^{LC}

– throughout England and Wales, and north to south-west Scotland

Subfamily Pyrginae

- Dingy skipper – Erynnis tages tages ^{LC}

– thinly distributed through much of England and Wales, and in the Scottish Highlands

- Grizzled skipper – Pyrgus malvae ^{V}

– southern England north to north-east Wales, and south-east Wales

== Papilionidae – swallowtails ==
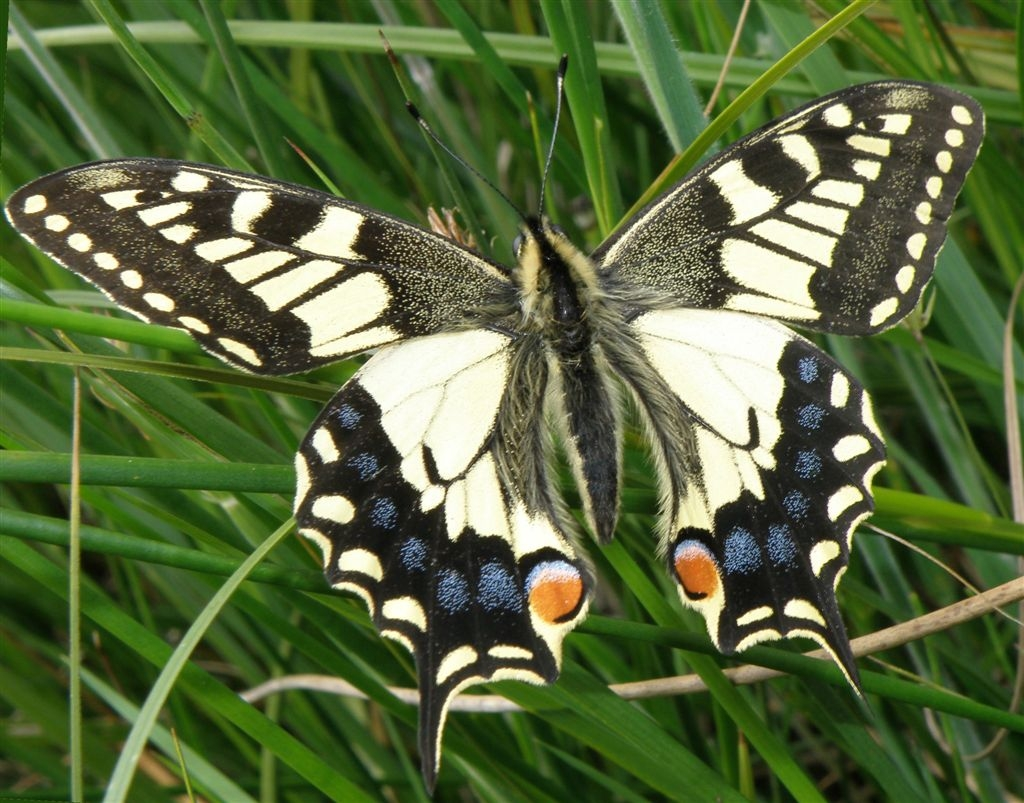
Old World swallowtail

Subfamily Papilioninae

- Swallowtail – Papilio machaon ^{V}

- P. machaon britannicus (endemic subspecies) – confined to Norfolk Broads (formerly also in The Fens)
- P. machaon gorganus – rare migrant and occasional breeder from Continental Europe to southern England and southern Wales

== Pieridae – whites and yellows ==
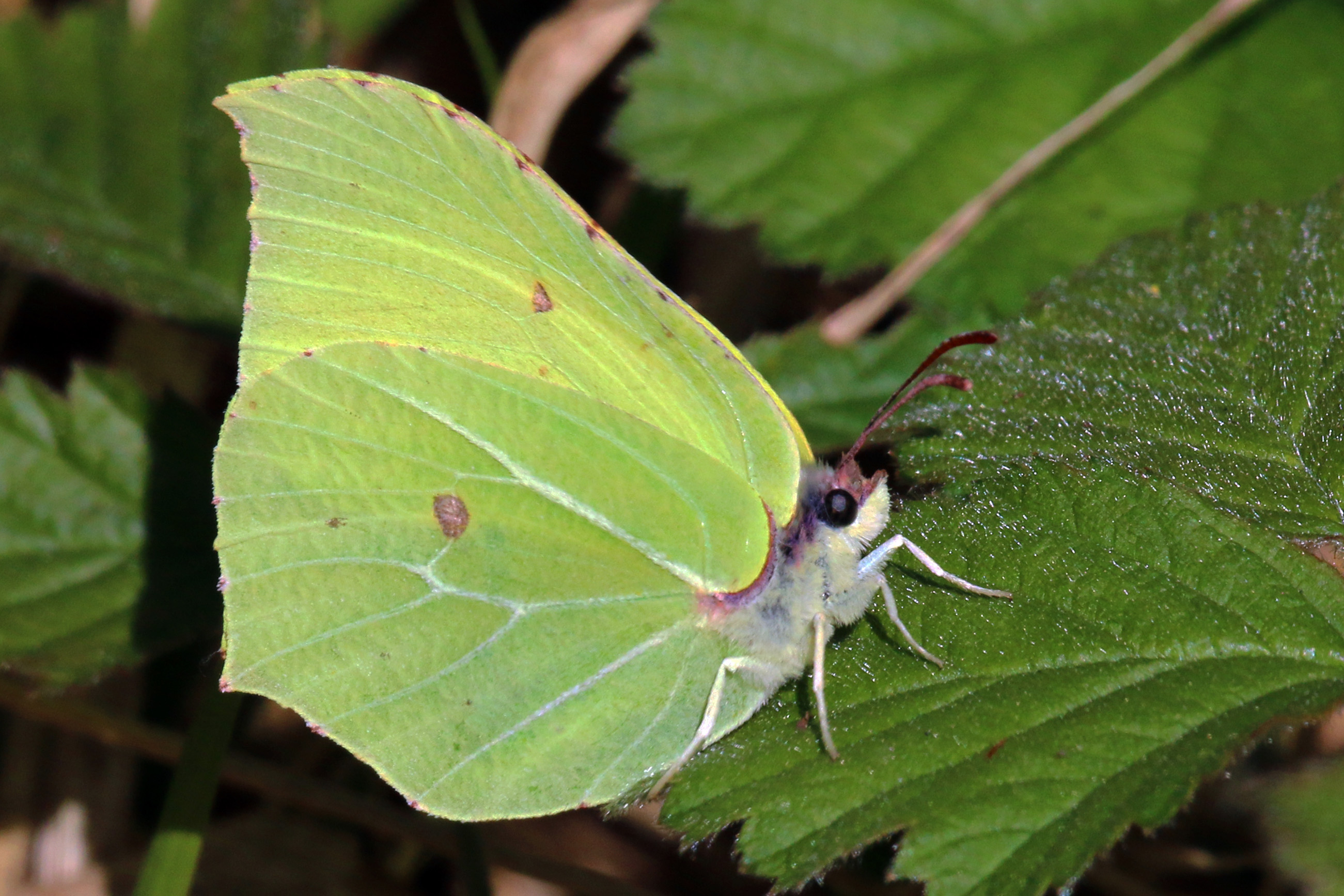
Common brimstone

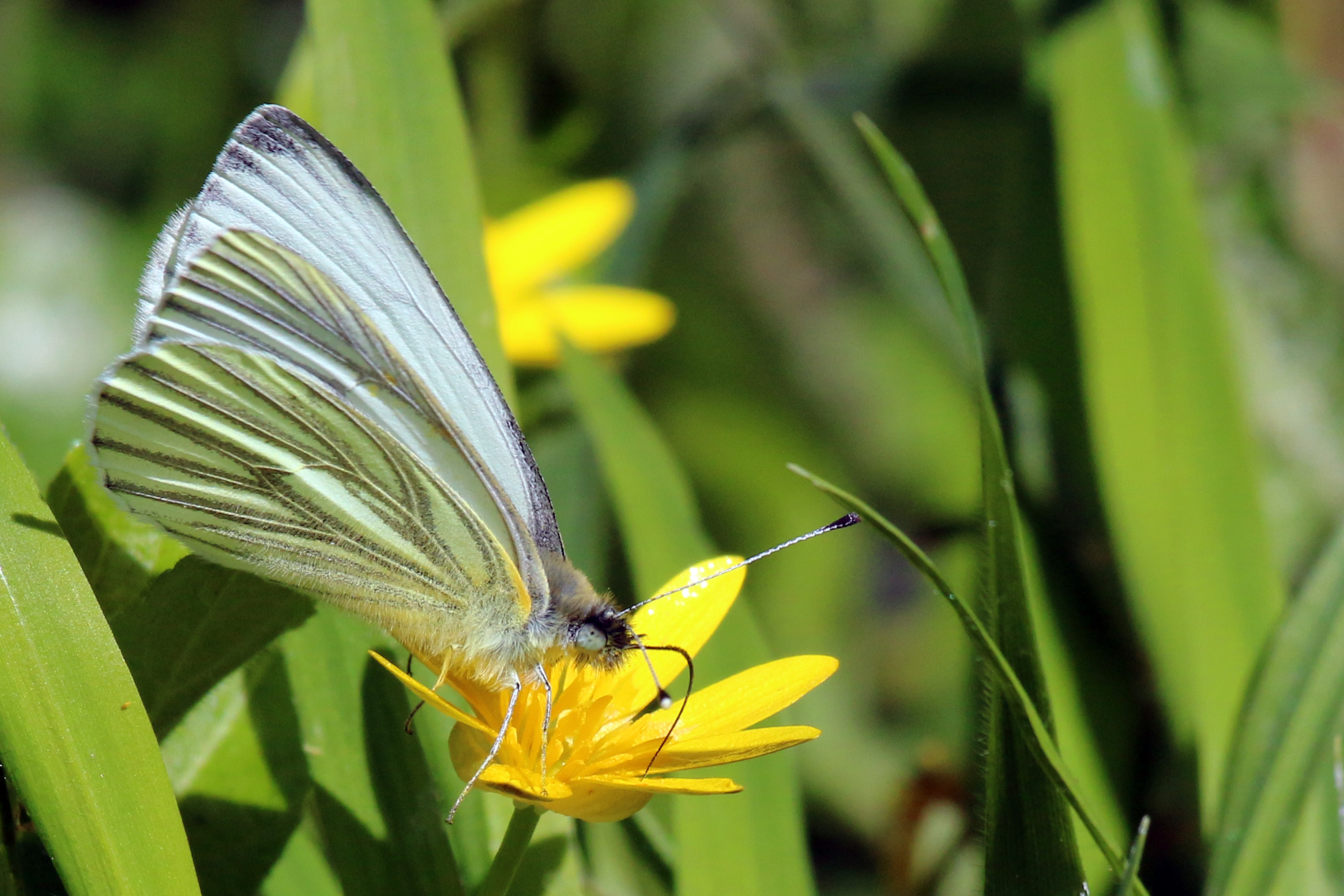
Green-veined white

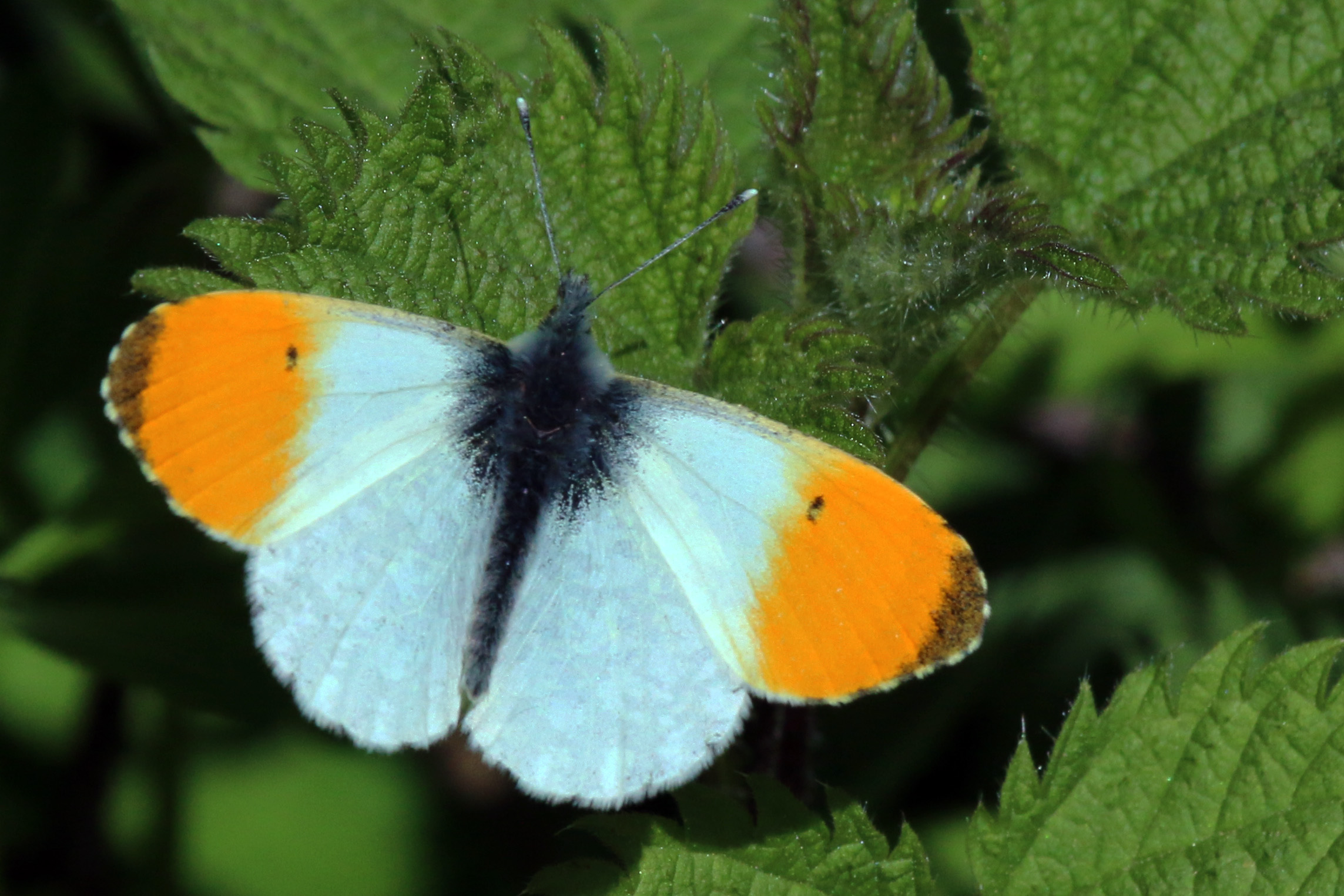
Male orange tip

Subfamily Dismorphiinae

- Wood white – Leptidea sinapis sinapis ^{E}

– Devon and west Somerset; Surrey; Buckinghamshire and Northamptonshire; and Worcestershire and Herefordshire

Subfamily Coliadinae

- Dark clouded yellow – Colias croceus ^{LC}

– immigrant, though overwintering in south-west; north to River Clyde in some years

- Common brimstone – Gonepteryx rhamni rhamni ^{LC}

– throughout England (except north) and Wales (except south-west, central west and far north-west); expanding range north and "infilling"

Subfamily Pierinae

- Large white – Pieris brassicae ^{LC}

– throughout, but thinly spread in north-west half of Scotland

- Small white – Pieris (Artogeia) rapae ^{LC}

– throughout, except far north

- Green-veined white – Pieris (Artogeia) napi ^{LC}

- P. napi sabellicae – throughout (except for area occupied by subspecies thomsoni)
- P. napi thomsoni – east-central Scotland

- Orange tip – Anthocharis cardamines britannica ^{LC}

– throughout, except far north and north-west; expanding range in Scotland and "infilling" in England and Wales

== Lycaenidae – hairstreaks, coppers and blues ==
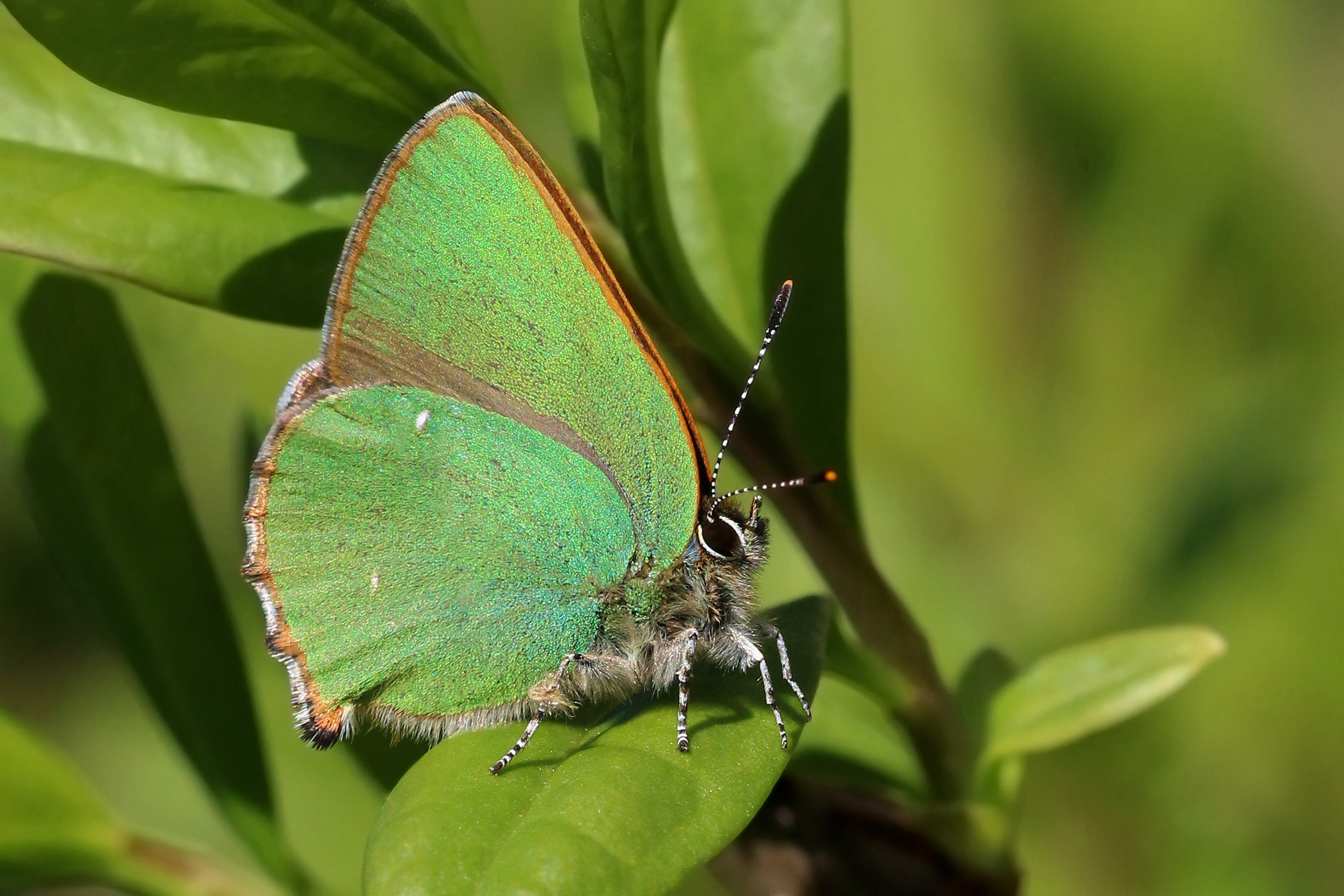
Green hairstreak

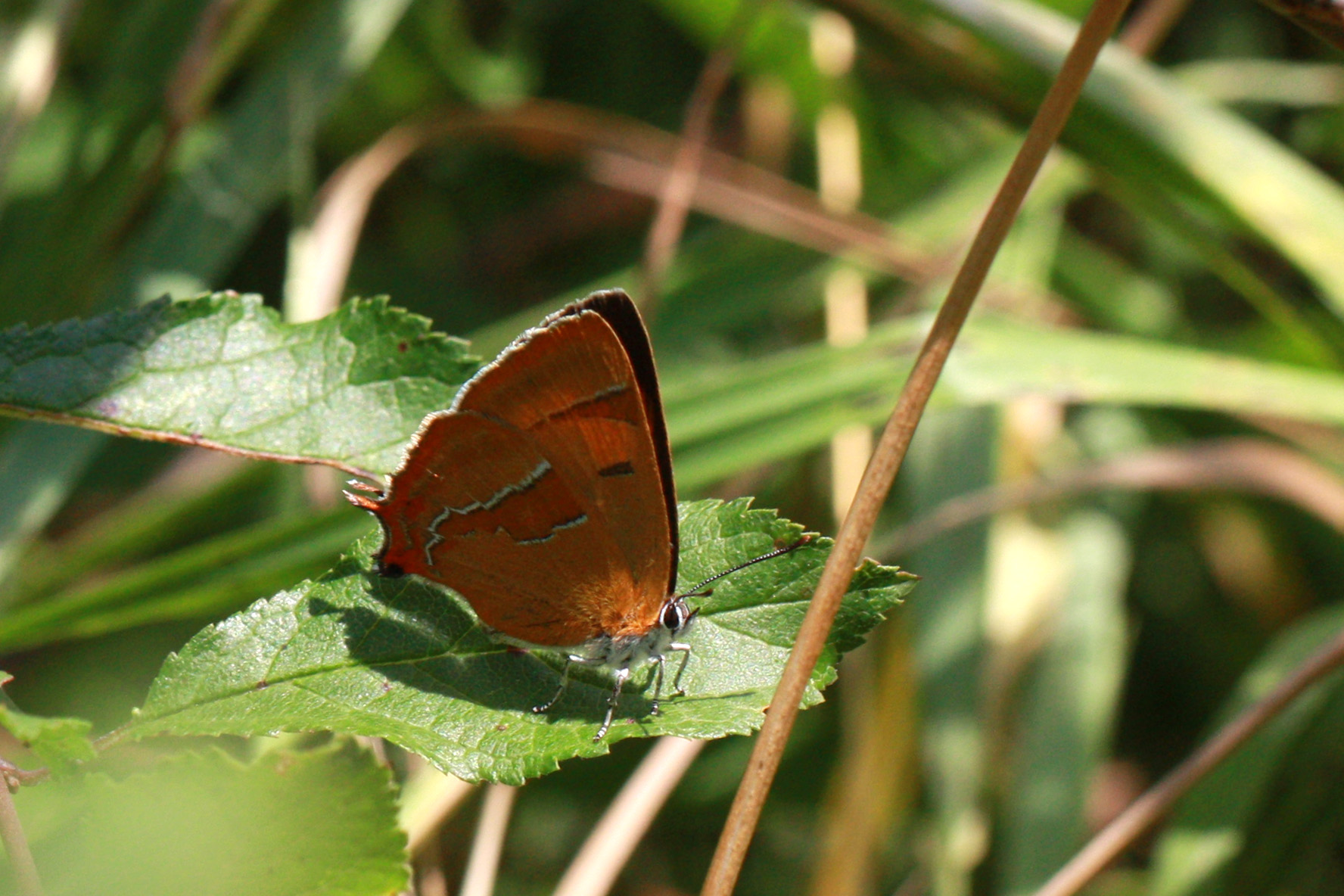
Brown hairstreak

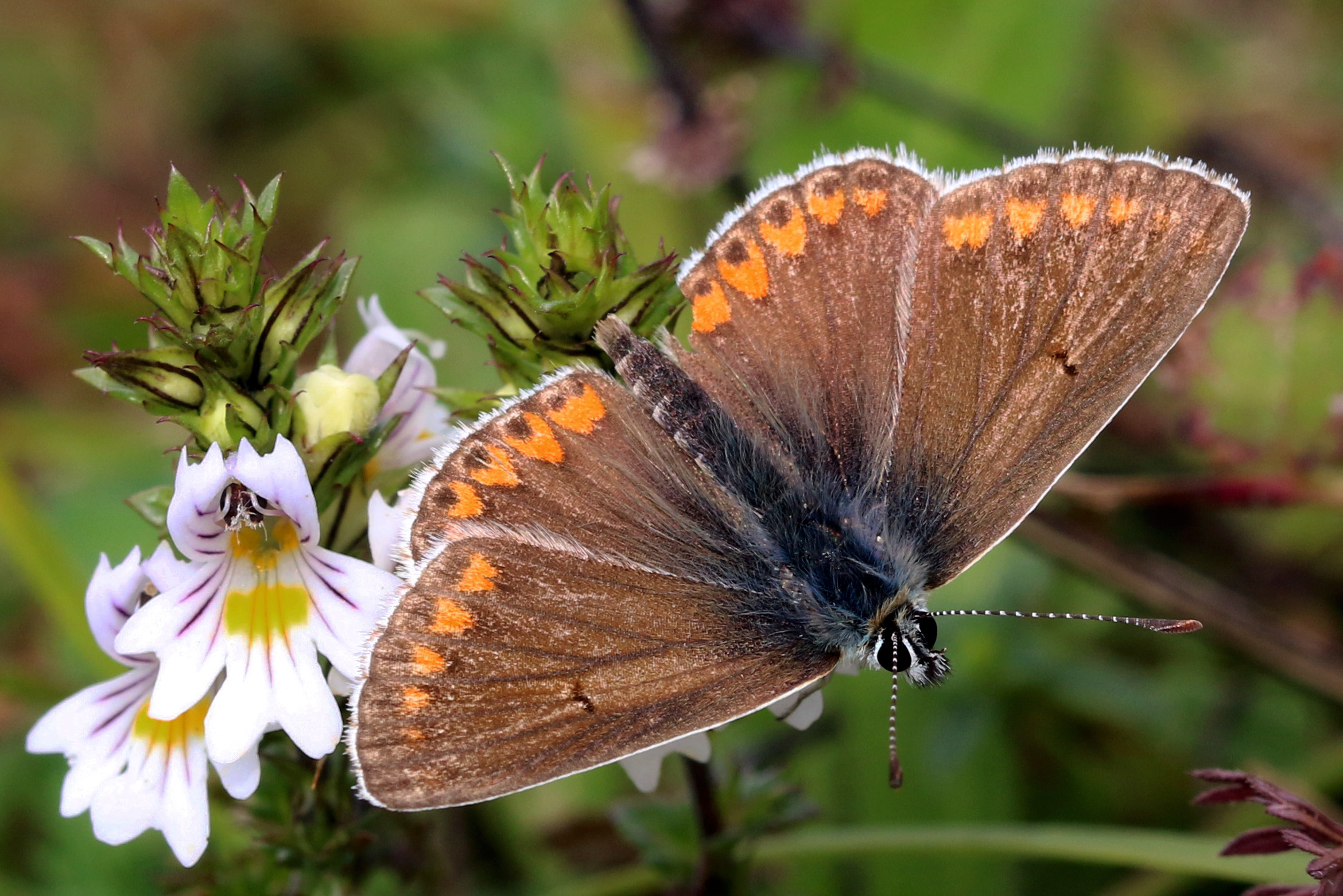
Brown argus

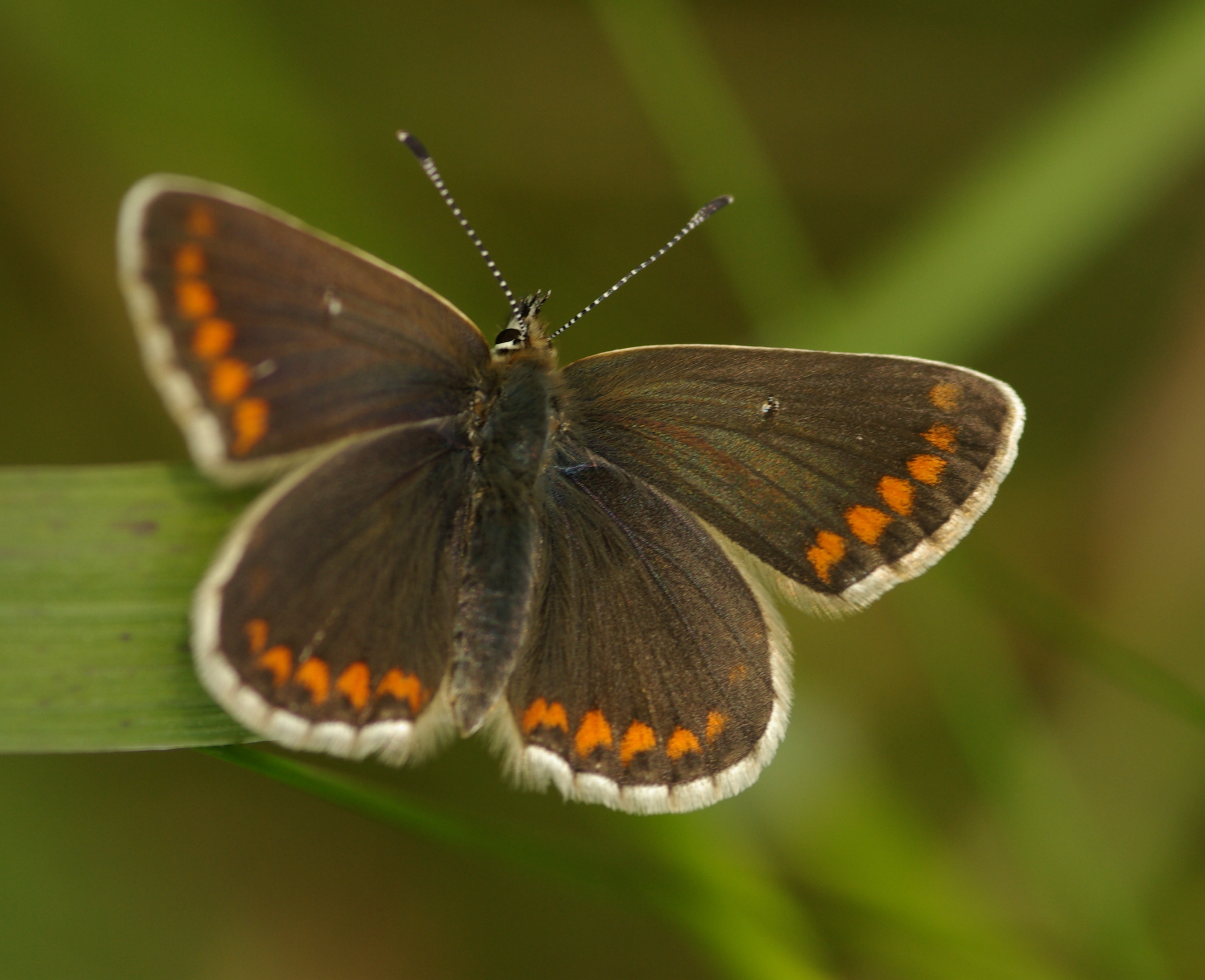
Northern brown argus

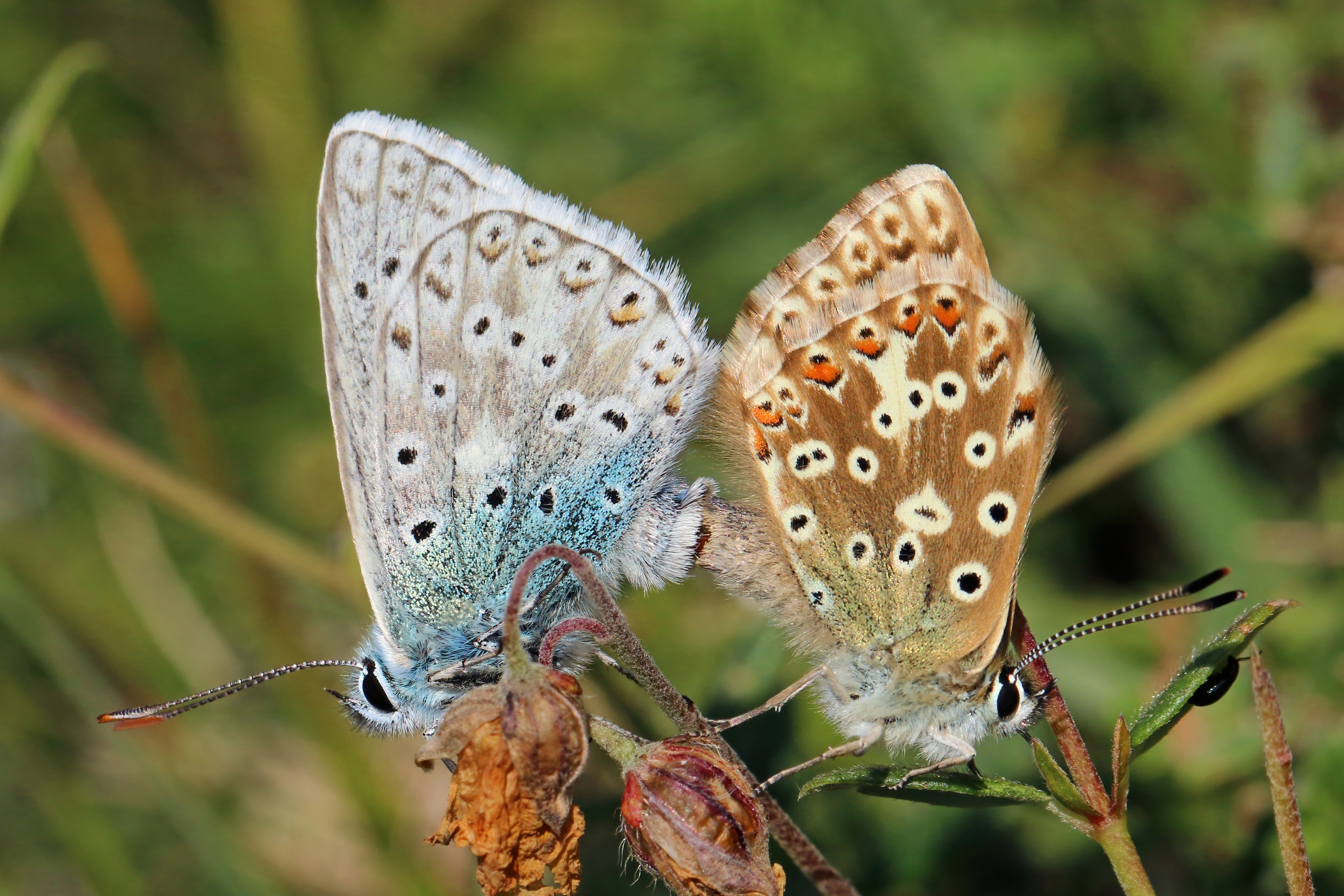
Chalkhill blue

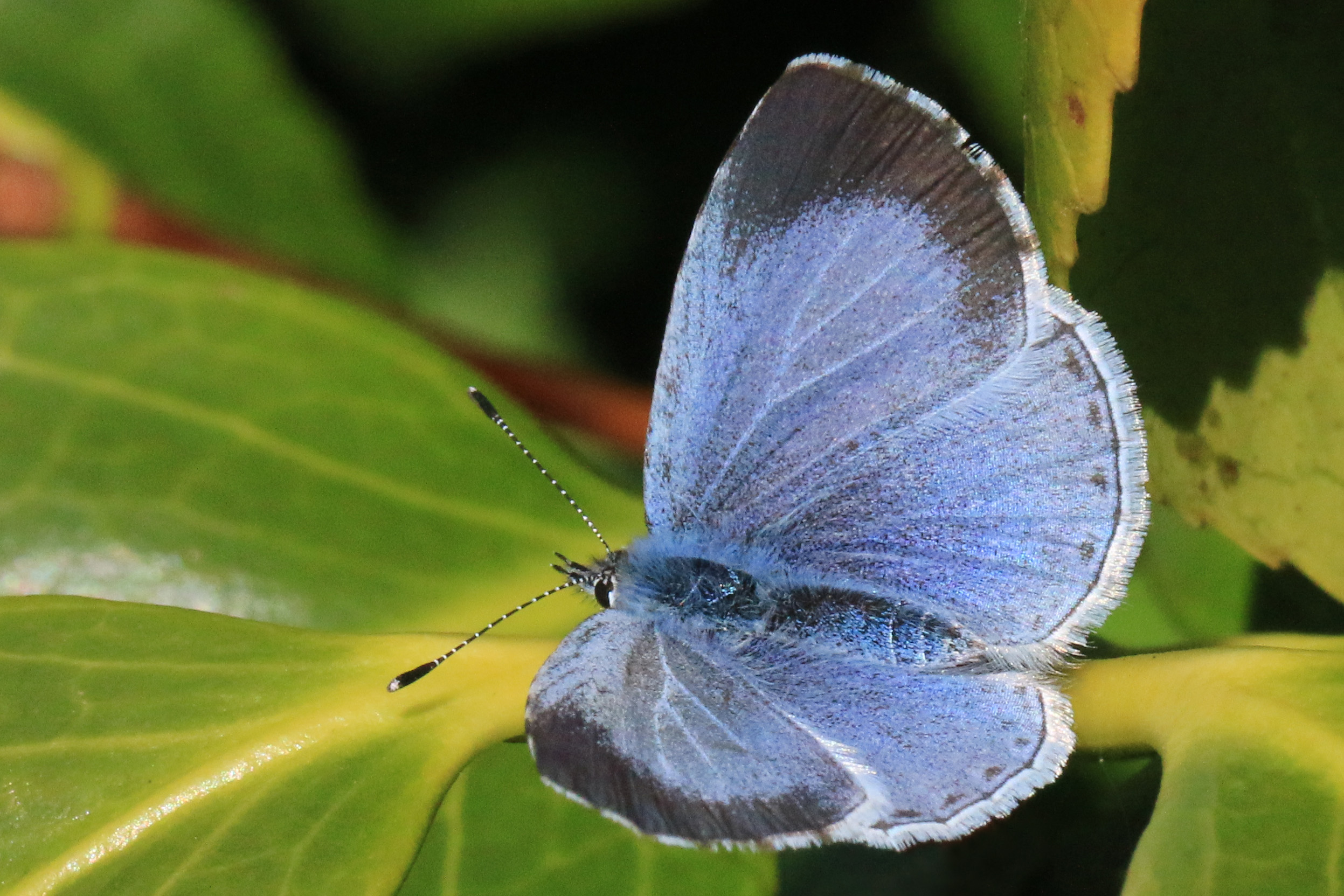
Holly blue

Subfamily Theclinae

- Green hairstreak – Callophrys rubi ^{LC}

– throughout much of country

- Brown hairstreak – Thecla betulae ^{V}

– south of the Humber estuary, with concentrations in south-west Wales, north Devon and south-west Somerset, and west Weald. In 2009 eggs were found at Feckenham Wylde Moor reserve in Worcestershire.

- Purple hairstreak – Neozephyrus (Quercusia) quercus ^{LC}

– throughout most of England and Wales, more thinly distributed north to River Clyde

- White-letter hairstreak – Satyrium (Strymonidia) w-album ^{V}

– throughout much of England (except far south-west and north-west) and eastern Wales

- Black hairstreak – Satyrium (Strymonidia) pruni ^{E}

– confined to heavy clay soils along Chiltern hills

Subfamily Lycaena

- Small copper – Lycaena phlaeas eleus ^{LC}

– throughout, except far north and north-west

Subfamily Polyommatinae

- Small blue – Cupido minimus ^{NT}

– southern and south-central England, south Wales coast, and east coast of Scotland (patchy distribution)

- Silver-studded blue – Plebejus argus ^{V}

- P. argus argus – south-west and south England, East Anglia coast, and north Wales and north-east Wales borders
- P. argus cretaceus – formerly on chalk and limestone downland of south and south-east coasts, now restricted to Portland Bill
- P. argus caernensis – Great Ormes Head (north Wales)
- P. argus masseyi – extinct (formerly north-west England)

- Brown argus – Aricia agestis ^{LC}

– throughout southern England, north to River Tees, south and north coasts of Wales; expanding range north
– evidence of hybridization with A. artaxerxes salmacis across northern England and Wales

- Northern brown argus – Aricia artaxerxes ^{V}

- A. artaxerxes salmacis (Castle Eden argus) – England from north Lancashire north

– evidence of hybridization with A. agestis across northern England and Wales

- A. artaxerxes artaxerxes – Scotland

- Common blue – Polyommatus icarus icarus ^{LC}

– throughout

- Chalkhill blue – Lysandra coridon ^{V}

– southern England

- Adonis blue – Lysandra bellargus ^{V}

– south England; expanding range north and west

- Holly blue – Celastrina argiolus britanna ^{LC}

– north to Solway Firth and River Tyne; expanding range north

- Large blue – Phengaris arion ^{NT}

- P. arion eutyphron (endemic subspecies) – extinct
- P. arion arion – introduced to various sites in west England

== Riodinidae – metalmarks ==
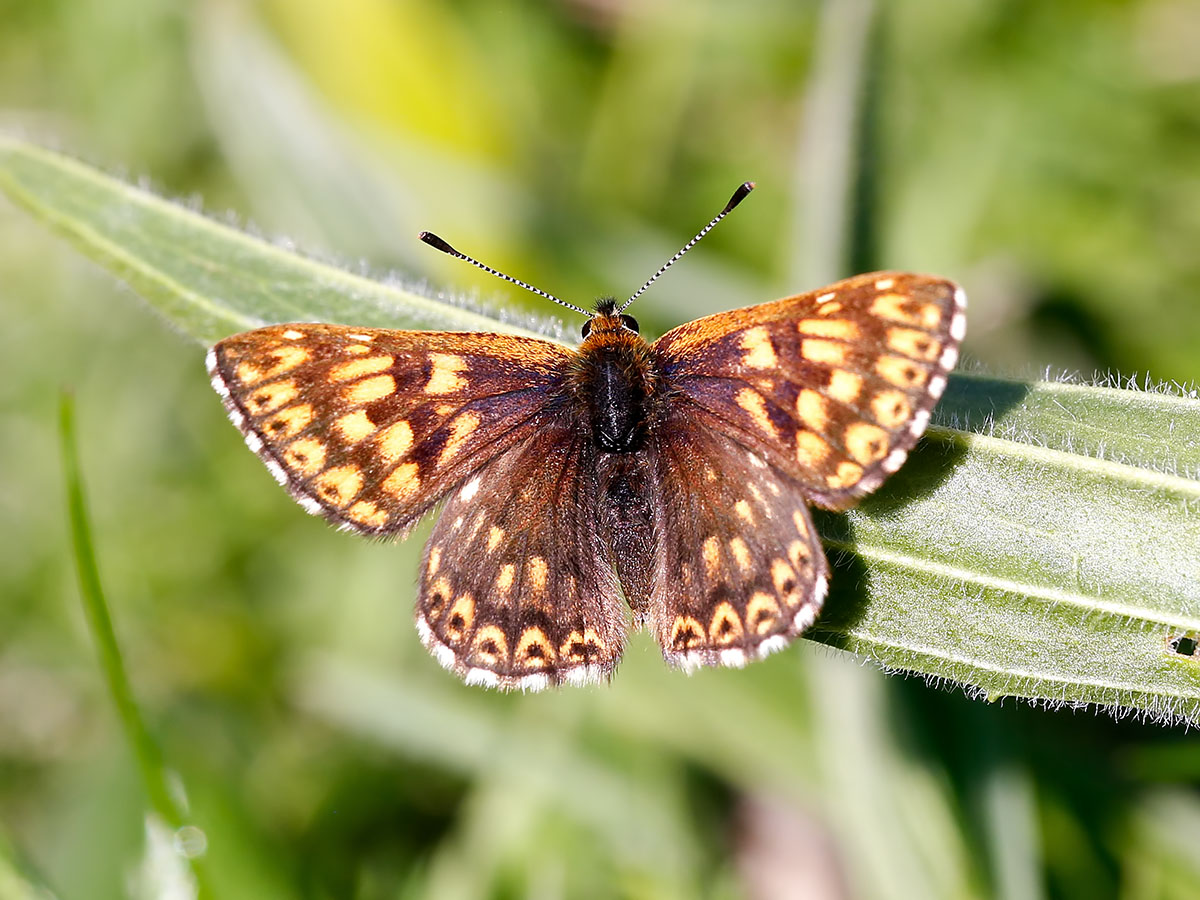
Duke of Burgundy

- Duke of Burgundy – Hamearis lucina ^{V}

– central-south England; "pockets" in north-east, north-west and south-east England

== Nymphalidae – fritillaries, nymphalids and browns ==
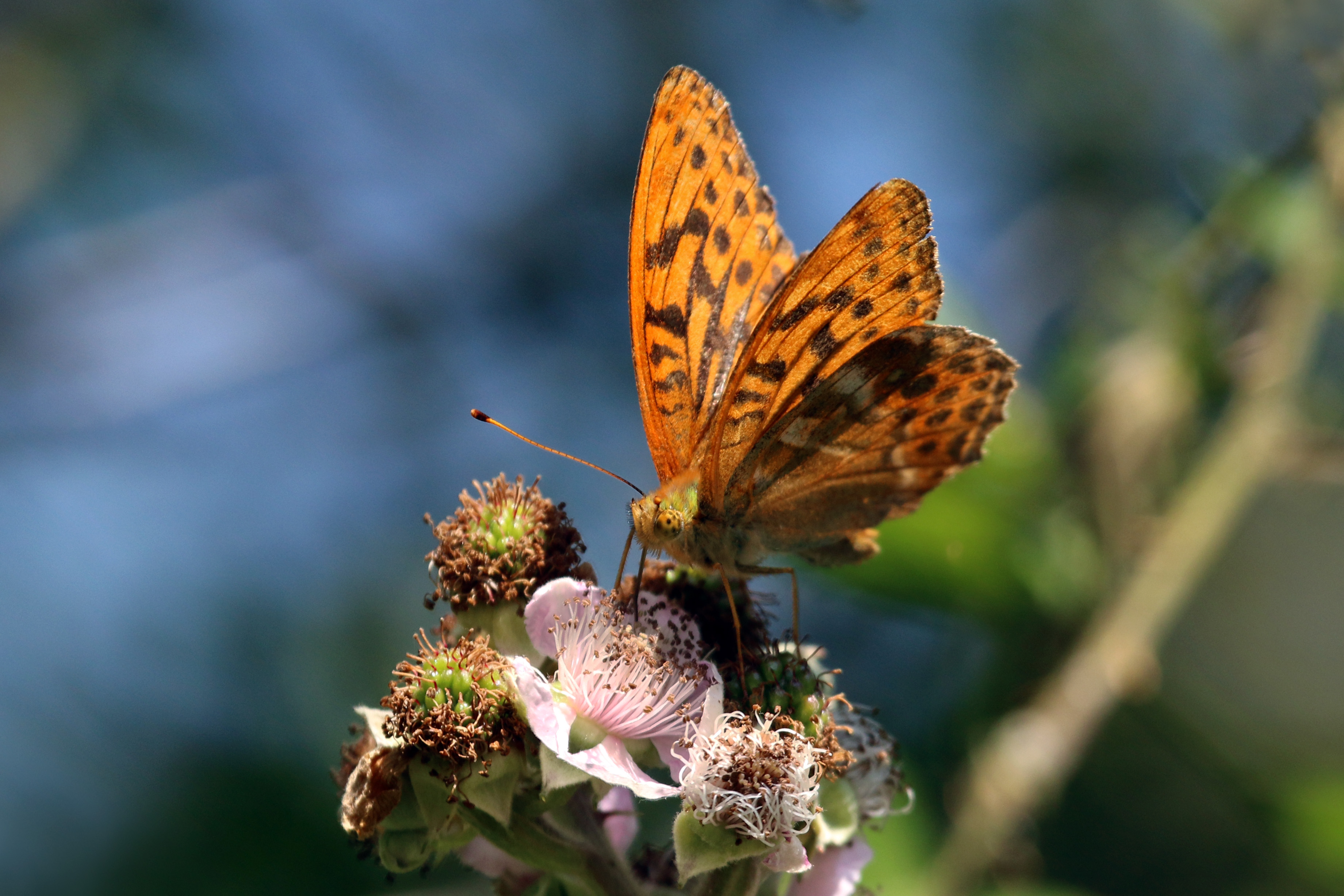
Silver-washed fritillary

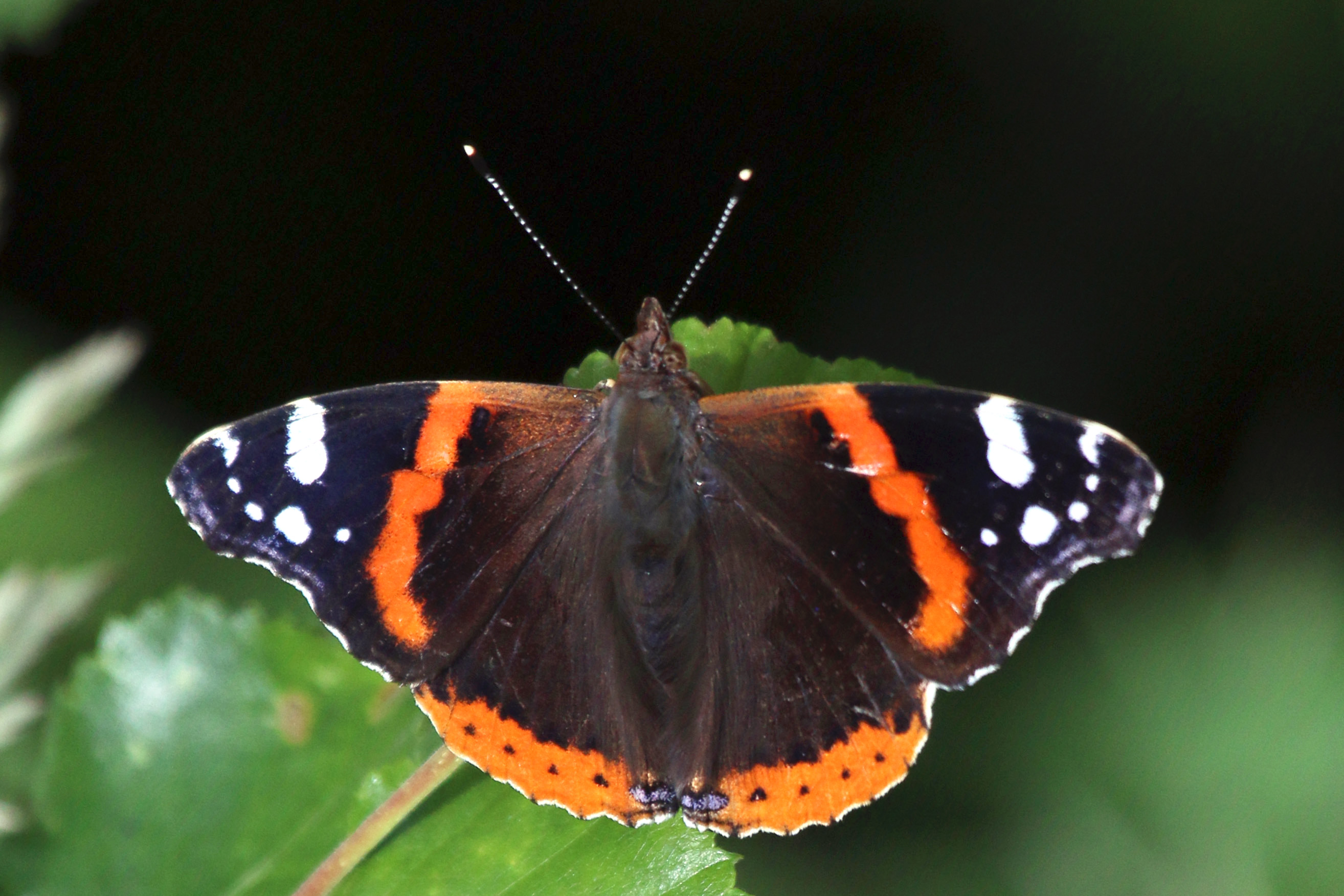
Red admiral

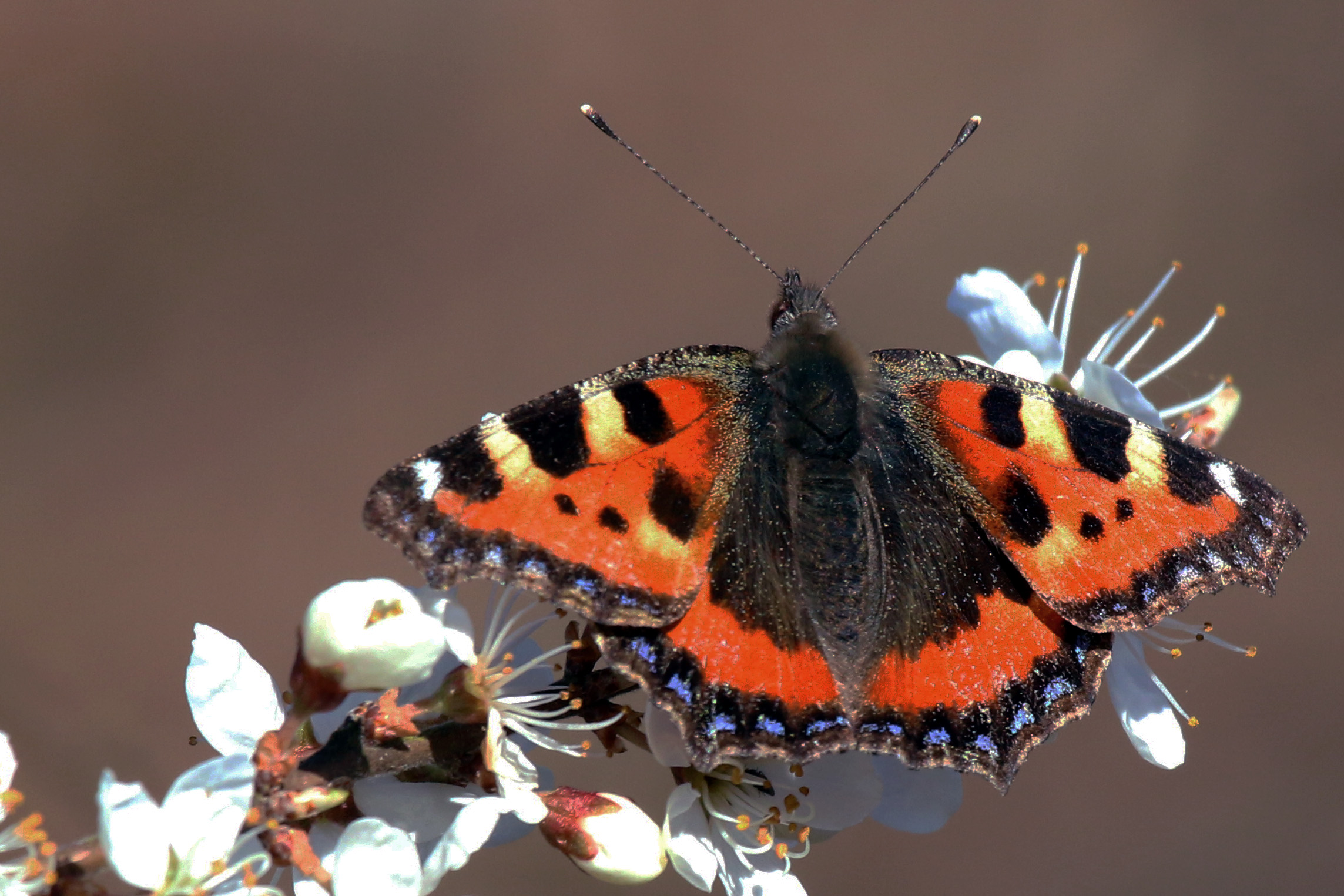
Small tortoiseshell

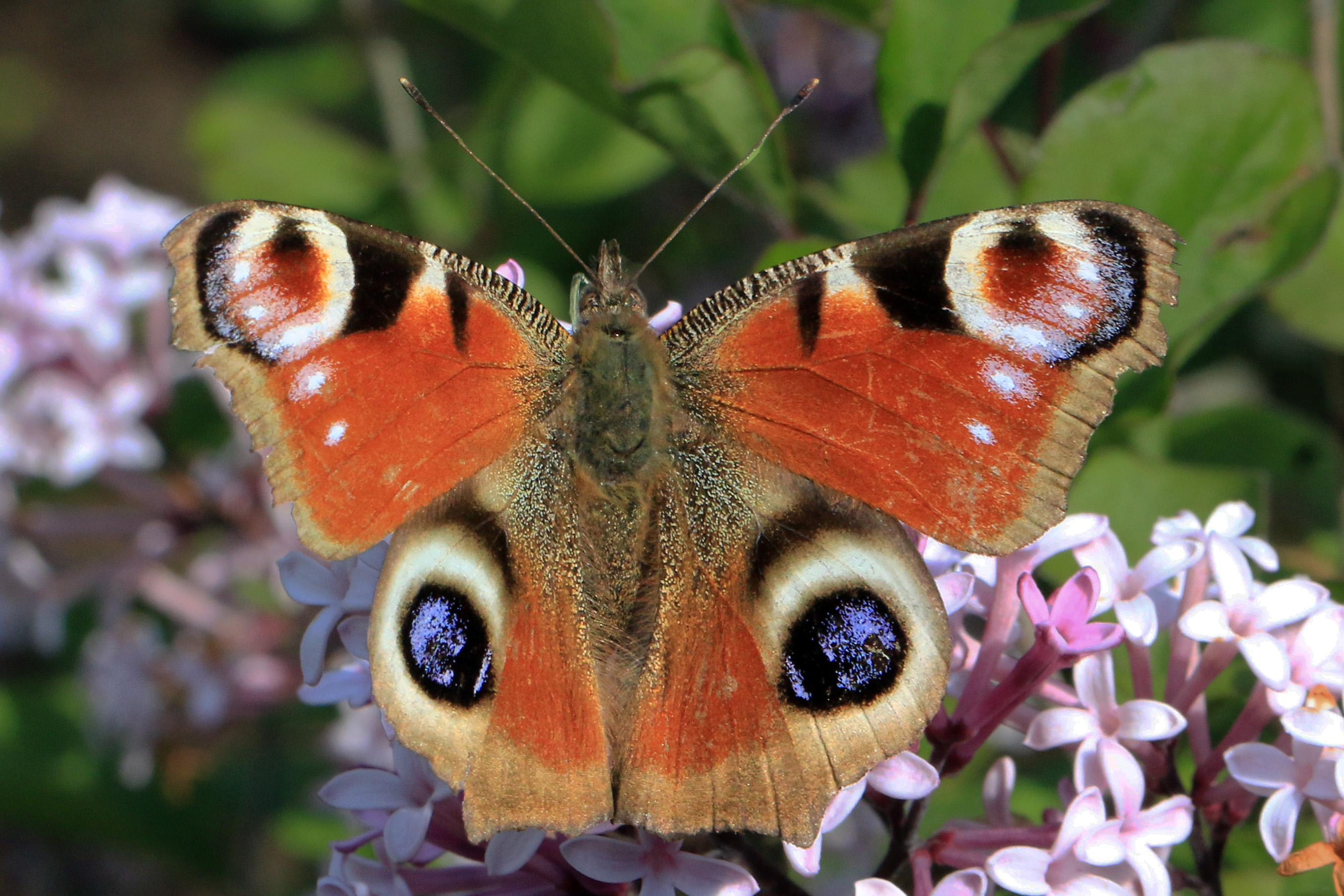
Peacock

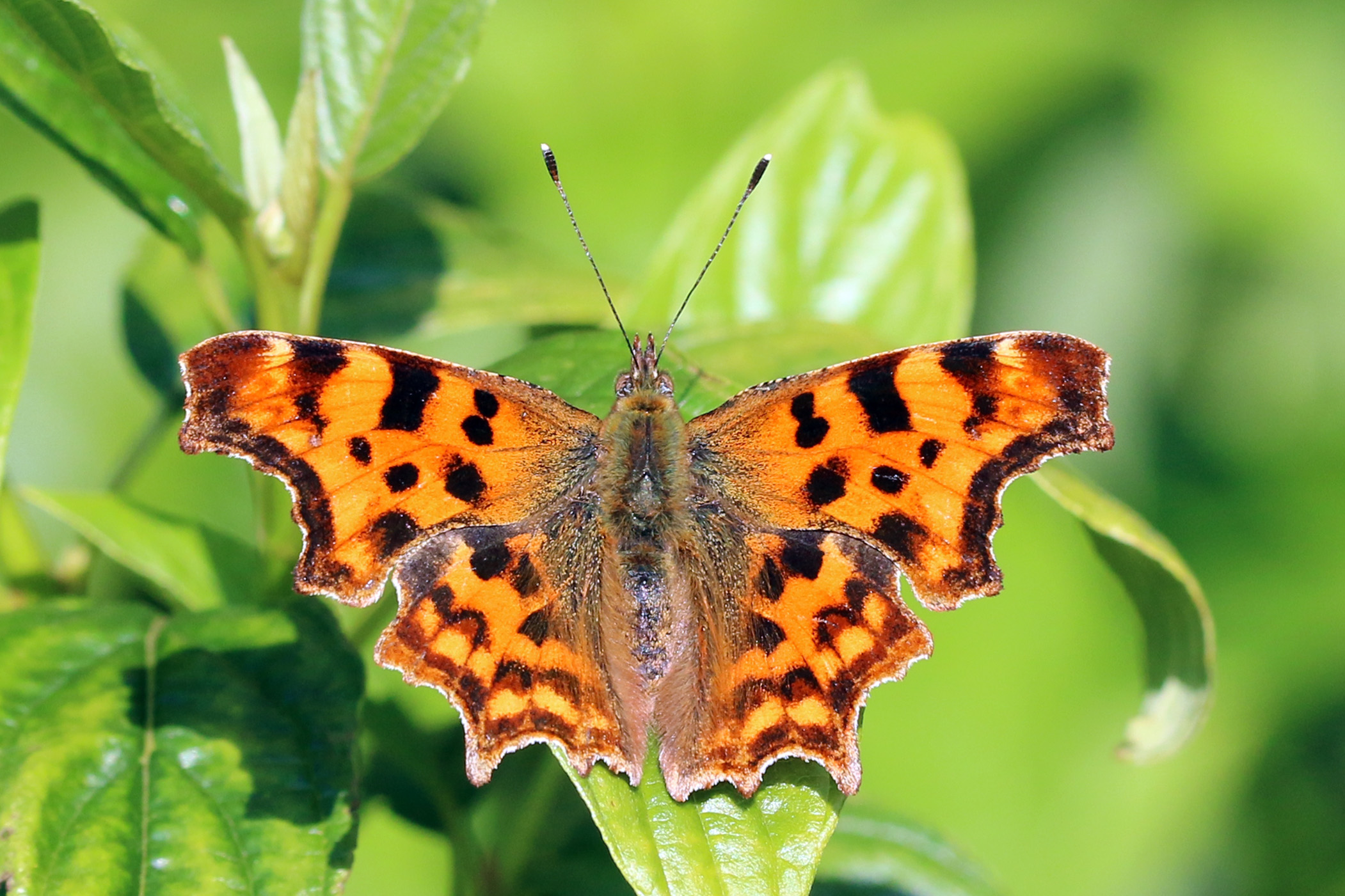
Comma

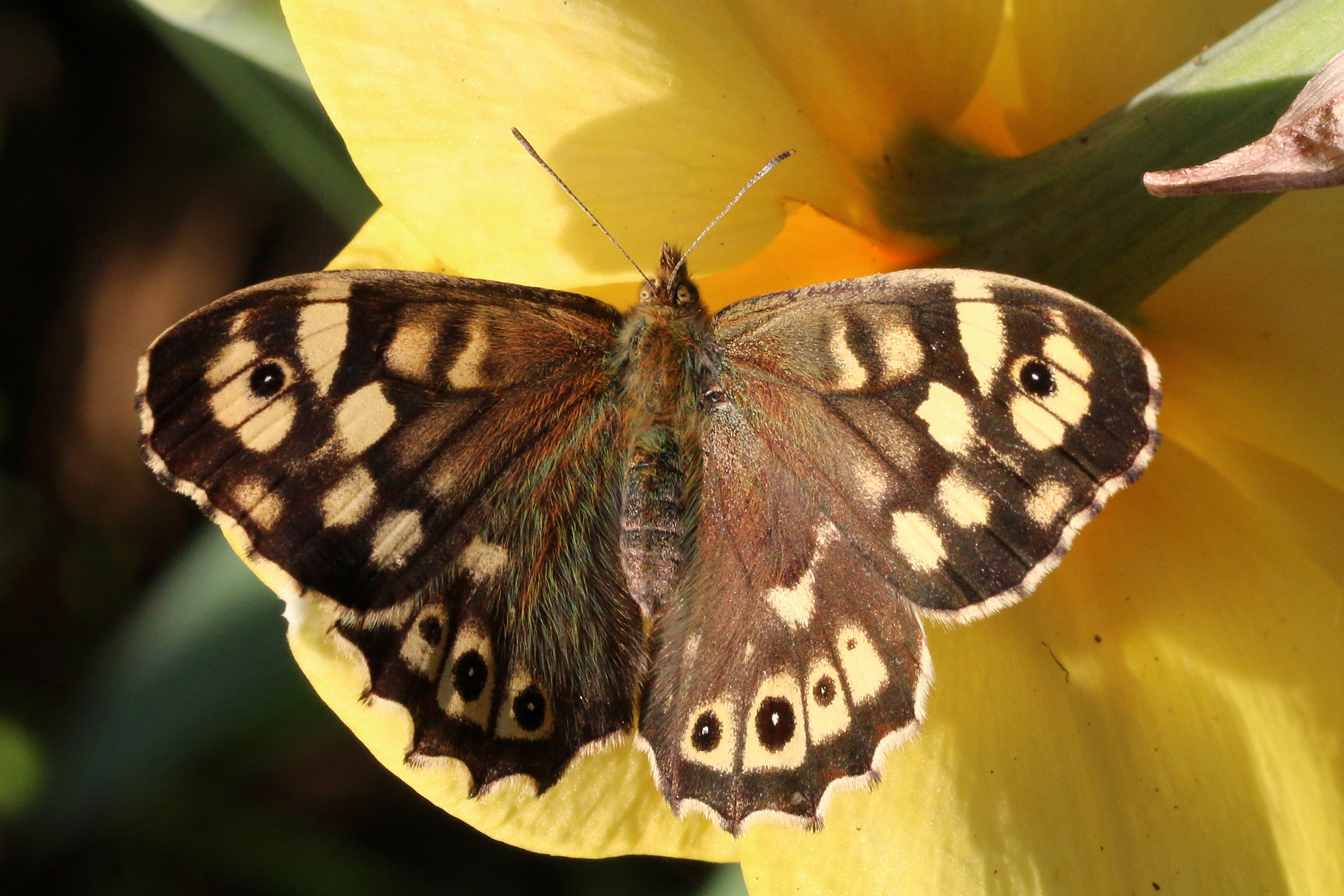
Speckled wood

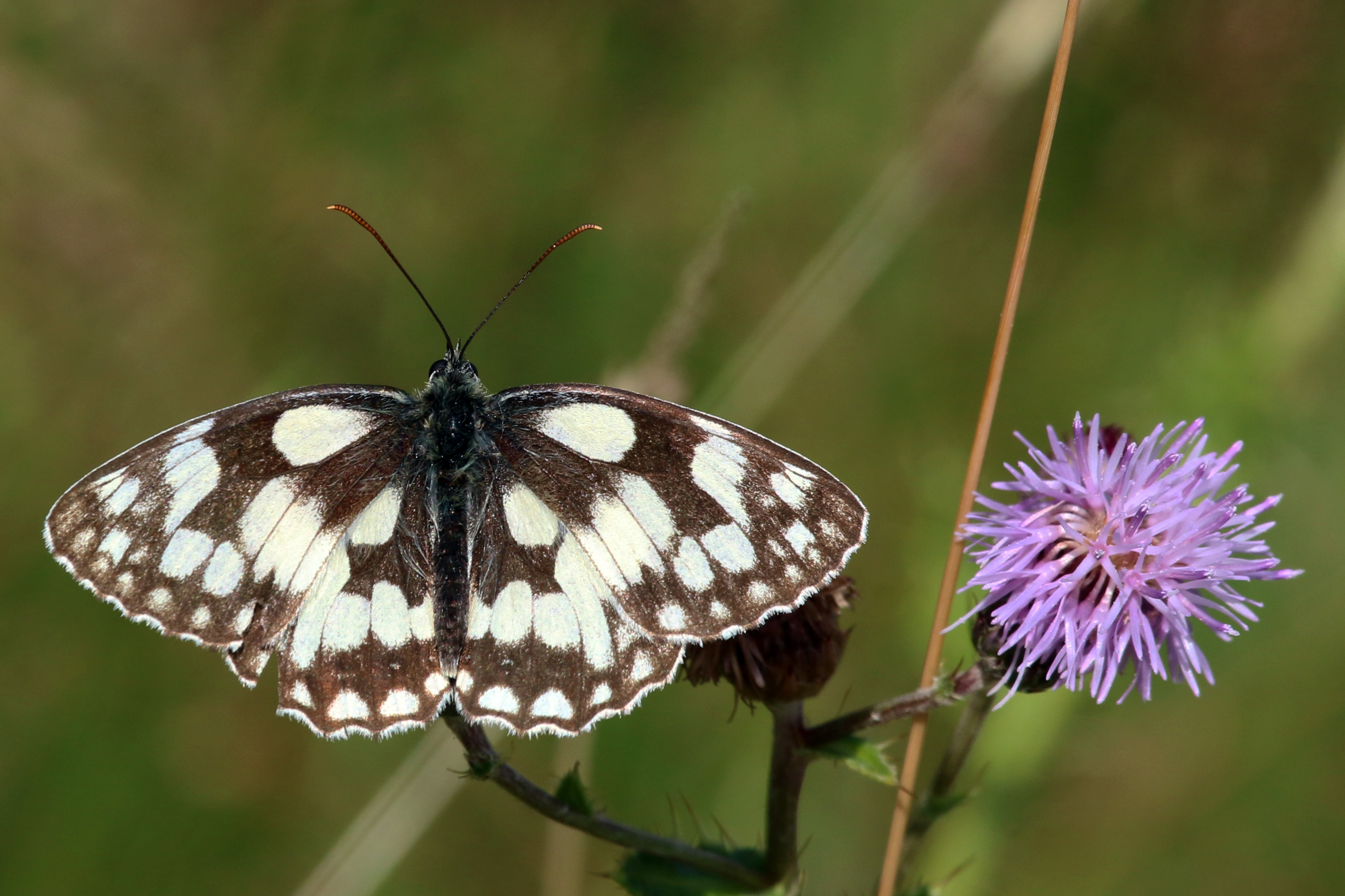
Marbled white

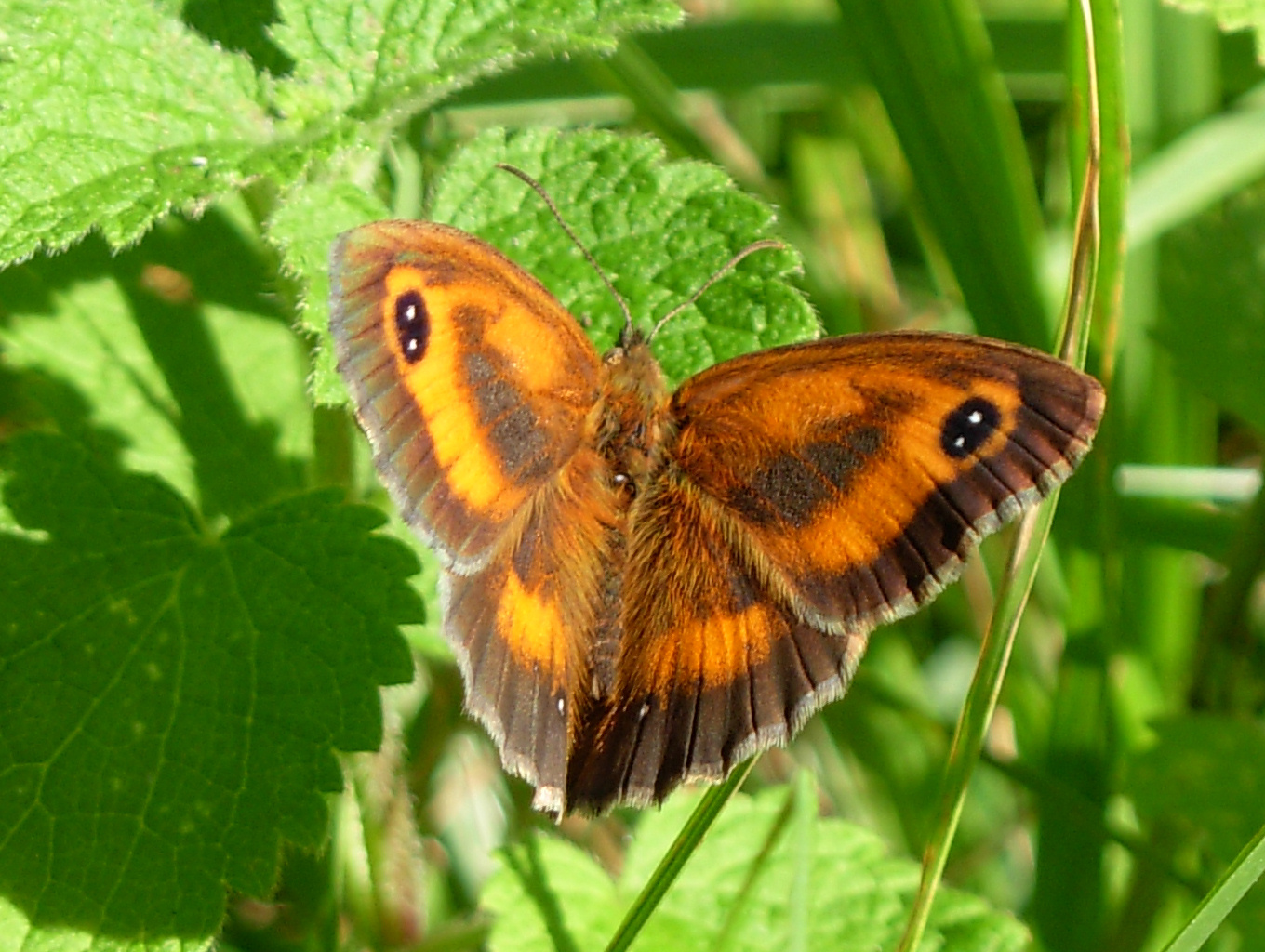
Gatekeeper

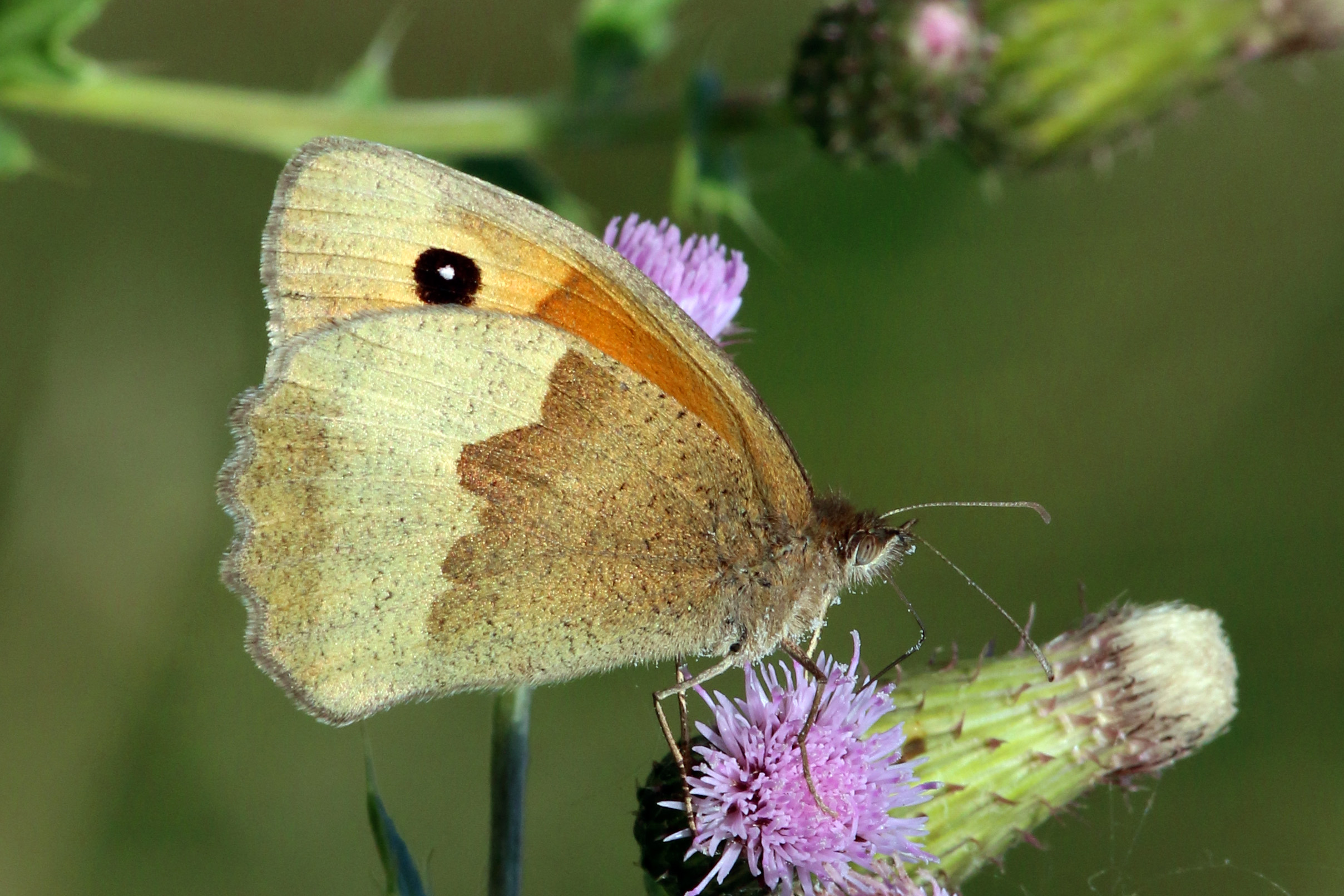
Meadow brown

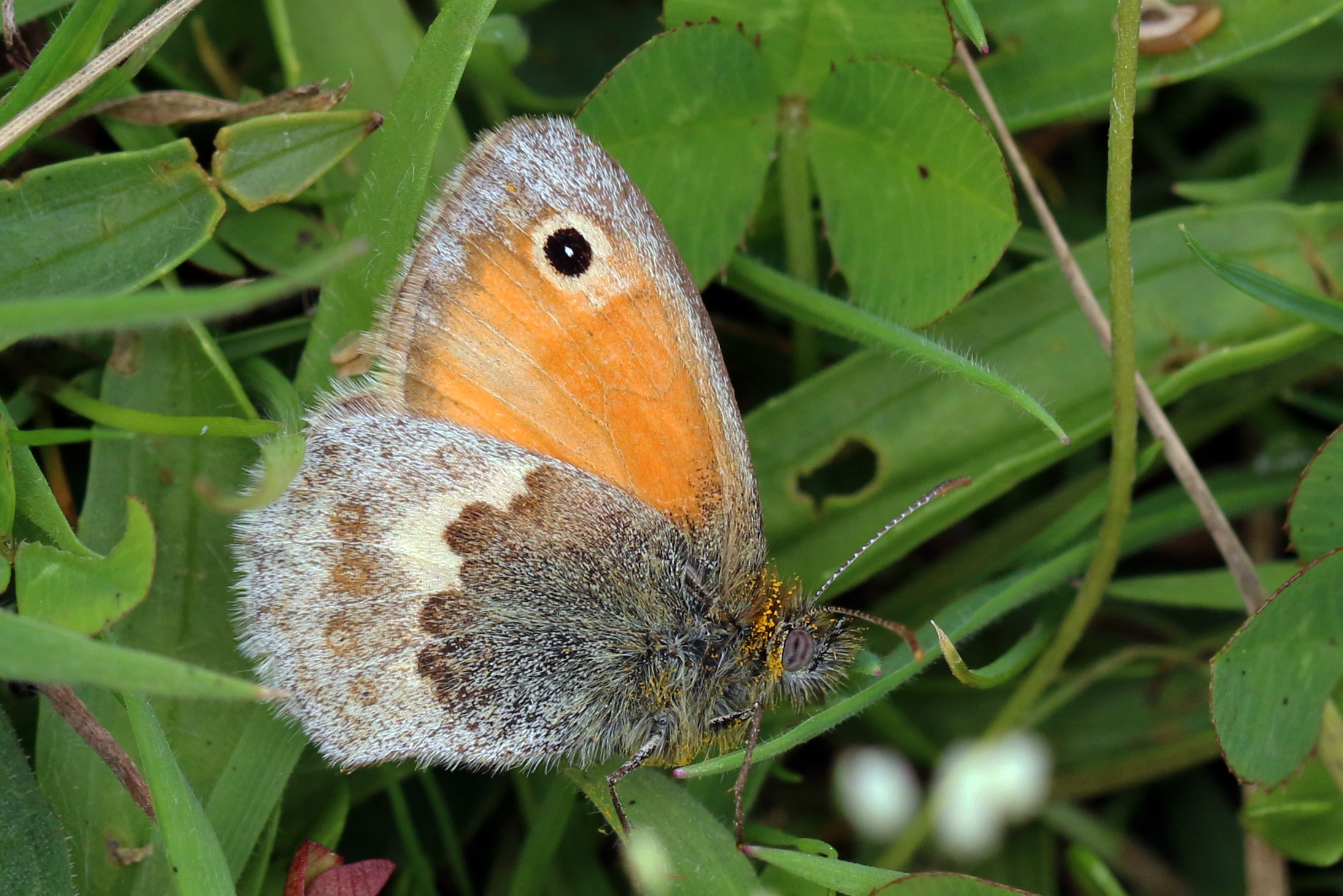
Small heath

Subfamily Heliconiinae

- Small pearl-bordered fritillary – Boloria (Clossiana) selene ^{V}

- B. selene selene – widespread in Wales, Scotland, southern and northern England
- B. selene insularum – western Scotland and Inner Hebrides

- Pearl-bordered fritillary – Boloria (Clossiana) euphrosyne ^{V}

– patchily distributed through southern England, Wales, north-west and north-east England, and Scotland

- High brown fritillary – Fabriciana adippe ^{E}

– patchy distribution in west England and Wales

- Dark green fritillary – Speyeria aglaja ^{NT}

- S. aglaja aglaja – patchy distribution throughout, except Scotland
- S. aglaja scotica – Scotland

- Silver-washed fritillary – Argynnis paphia ^{LC}

– south-western half of England and Wales; (re)expanding range east, including East Anglia

Subfamily Limenitidinae

- White admiral – Limenitis camilla ^{V}

– southern England and eastern Wales

Subfamily Apaturinae

- Purple emperor – Apatura iris ^{LC}

– southern England

Subfamily Nymphalinae

- Red admiral – Vanessa atalanta ^{LC}

– resident and common immigrant throughout

- Painted lady – Vanessa cardui^{LC}

– immigrant throughout

- Small tortoiseshell – Aglais urticae ^{LC}

– throughout

- Peacock – Aglais io^{LC}

– throughout, except Scottish Highlands and Western Isles; expanding range throughout Scotland, including Western Isles

- Comma – Polygonia c-album ^{LC}

– throughout England and Wales; expanding range northwards and spreading in southern Scotland

- Marsh fritillary – Euphydryas (Eurodryas) aurinia ^{V}

– patchy distribution, mostly in west

- Glanville fritillary – Melitaea cinxia ^{E}

– southern coast of Isle of Wight and Channel Islands (formerly widespread in south-east)

- Heath fritillary – Melitaea athalia ^{E}

– West Country and Kent; re-introduced to Essex

Subfamily Satyrinae

- Speckled wood – Pararge aegeria ^{LC}

- P. aegeria tircis – throughout southern third of Great Britain, Scottish Highlands; expanding range north and east in England and Scotland; has colonized Isle of Man
- P. aegeria oblita – western Scotland and Inner Hebrides
- P. aegeria insula – Isles of Scilly

- Wall – Lasiommata megera ^{E}

– throughout England and Wales, southern Scotland (localized); expanding north and "infilling", but declined rapidly inland in East Anglia

- Small mountain ringlet – Erebia epiphron ^{NT}

- E. epiphron mnemon – Cumbria
- E. epiphron scotica – central Scotland

- Scotch argus – Erebia aethiops ^{V}

- E. aethiops aethiops – Cumbria
- E. aethiops caledonia – Scotland

- Marbled white – Melanargia galathea serena ^{LC}

– throughout south-east half of the country, including West Country, but not most of East Anglia; expanding range northwards

- Grayling – Hipparchia semele ^{E}

- H. semele semele – much of English coast, inland in parts of south and East Anglia
- H. semele scota – eastern Scotland (near coast)
- H. semele thyone – Wales
- H. semele atlantica – Hebrides

- Gatekeeper – Pyronia tithonus britanniae ^{LC}

– throughout southern half of country, except central Wales; expanding range northwards

- Meadow brown – Maniola jurtina ^{LC}

- M. jurtina insularis – throughout (except for areas occupied by other subspecies)
- M. jurtina cassiteridum – Isles of Scilly
- M. jurtina splendida – western Scotland, including Hebrides

- Ringlet – Aphantopus hyperantus ^{LC}

– throughout, except north-west England and north-west half of Scotland; expanding range in English Midlands, western England, English–Scottish borders, and Scotland; "infilling" southern Scotland

- Small heath – Coenonympha pamphilus ^{V}

- C. pamphilus pamphilus – throughout, except far north and Hebrides
- C. pamphilus rhoumensis – Hebrides

- Large heath – Coenonympha tullia ^{E}

- C. tullia davus – patchy distribution throughout northern and central England
- C. tullia polydama – central-west and north Wales, northern England and southern Scotland
- C. tullia scotica – rest of Scotland

== Vagrant, extinct and exotic species ==
Extinct

- Arran brown – Erebia ligea
- Black-veined white – Aporia crataegi ^{RE}
- Mazarine blue – Cyaniris semiargus (now vagrant only)^{RE}
- Large copper – Lycaena dispar (Great Britain subspecies extinct; continental subspecies introduced now also extinct)^{RE}
- Large tortoiseshell – Nymphalis polychloros (now vagrant only, although sightings in southern England since 2007 suggest recolonisation may be occurring)^{RE}
- Almond-eyed ringlet – Erebia alberganus

Vagrants

- Pale clouded yellow – Colias hyale
- Berger's clouded yellow – Colias alfacariensis
- Bath white – Pontia daplidice
- Western dappled white – Euchloe crameri
- Southern small white – Pieris mannii
- Long-tailed blue – Lampides boeticus
- Lang's short-tailed blue – Leptotes pirithous
- Scarce swallowtail – Iphiclides podalirius
- Short-tailed blue – Cupido (Everes) argiades
- Geranium bronze – Cacyreus marshalli (imported on geraniums)
- Scarce or yellow-legged tortoiseshell – Nymphalis xanthomelas
- Camberwell beauty – Nymphalis antiopa
- Map – Araschnia levana (formerly introduced and bred)
- Queen of Spain fritillary – Issoria lathonia
- Monarch – Danaus plexippus
- Plain tiger – Danaus chrysippus (single record from Cambridgeshire, April 2011, coincident with influx of vagrant Odonata)
- Apollo – Parnassius apollo
- American painted lady – Vanessa virginiensis

Exotics

Species included in the Great Britain Lepidoptera numbering system, but believed never to have occurred naturally in a wild state

- Fiery skipper – Hylephila phyleus
- Mallow skipper – Carcharodus alceae
- Oberthür's grizzled skipper – Pyrgus armoricanus
- Shy saliana – Saliana longirostris
- Small Apollo – Parnassius phoebus
- Spanish festoon – Zerynthia rumina
- Southern festoon – Zerynthia polyxena
- Tiger swallowtail – Papilio glaucus
- Moorland clouded yellow – Colias palaeno
- Cleopatra – Gonepteryx cleopatra
- Slate flash – Rapala schistacea
- Scarce copper – Lycaena virgaureae
- Sooty copper – Lycaena tityrus
- Purple-shot copper – Lycaena alciphron
- Purple-edged copper – Lycaena hippothoe
- Turquoise blue – Polyommatus dorylas
- Green-underside blue – Glaucopsyche alexis
- Julia – Dryas julia
- Albin's Hampstead eye (meadow argus) – Junonia villida
- Blue pansy – Junonia oenone
- Zebra – Colobura dirce
- Small brown shoemaker (orange mapwing) – Hypanartia lethe
- Indian red admiral – Vanessa indica
- Weaver's fritillary – Boloria dia
- Aphrodite fritillary – Speyeria aphrodite
- Niobe fritillary – Fabriciana niobe
- Cardinal or Mediterranean fritillary – Argynnis pandora
- Great spangled fritillary – Speyeria cybele
- Spotted fritillary – Melitaea didyma
- Large wall – Lasiommata maera
- Woodland grayling – Hipparchia fagi
- Hermit – Chazara briseis
- False grayling – Arethusana arethusa
- Cassia's owl-butterfly – Opsiphanes cassiae
- Illioneus giant owl – Caligo illioneus

== See also ==
- Butterfly Conservation – Britain's butterfly and moth conservation society
- List of butterflies of Ireland
- List of moths of Great Britain
