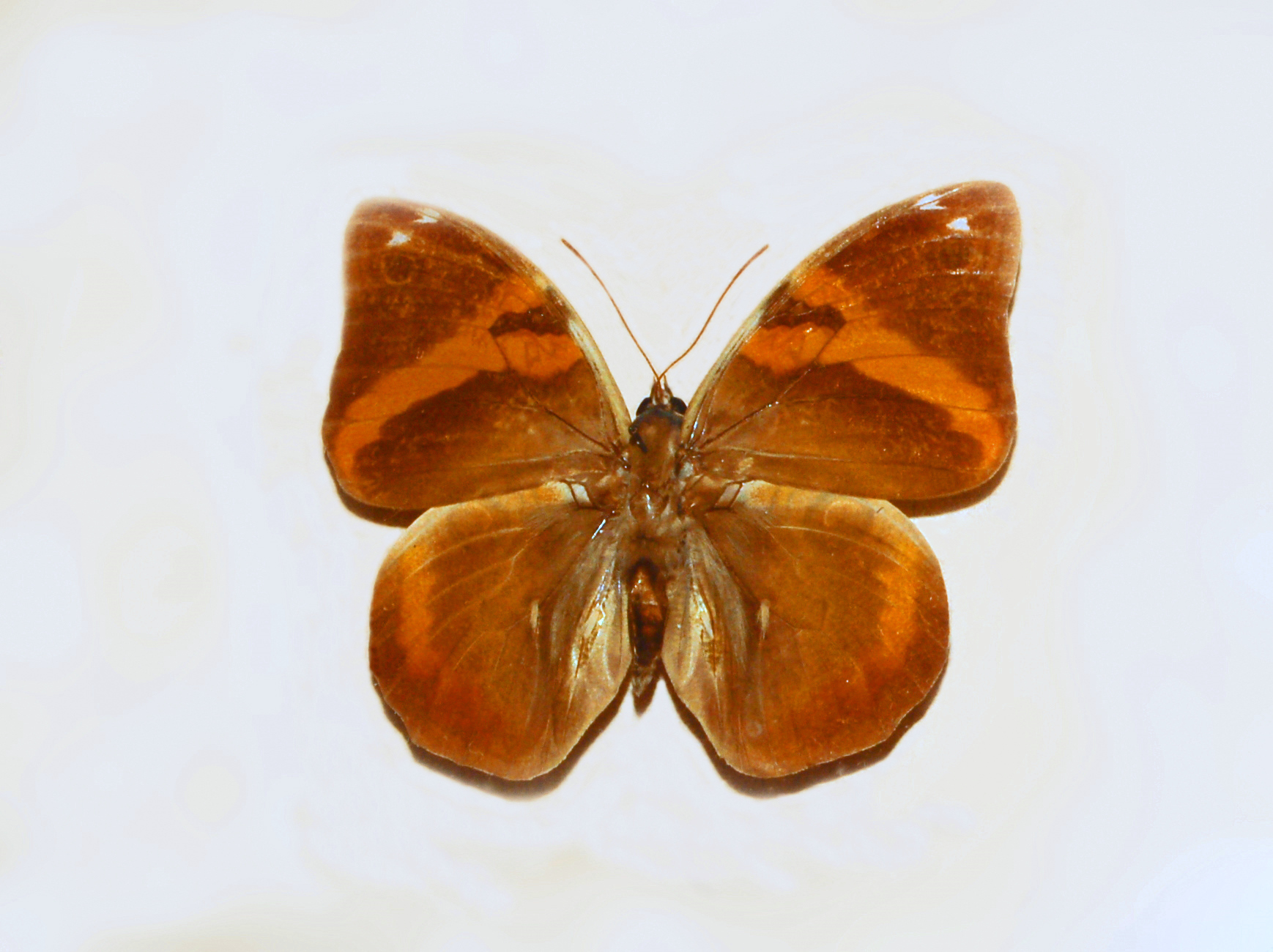
- From Peru

Scientific classification
- Kingdom: Animalia
- Phylum: Arthropoda
- Class: Insecta
- Order: Lepidoptera
- Family: Nymphalidae
- Genus: Opsiphanes
- Species: O. cassina

Binomial name
- Opsiphanes cassina C. & R. Felder, 1862

Synonyms
- Opsiphanes cassina aiellae Bristow, 1991; Opsiphanes cassina periphetes Fruhstorfer, 1912; Opsiphanes cassina aucotti Bristow, 1991

= Opsiphanes cassina =

Split-banded owlet

Species of butterfly

Opsiphanes cassina, the split-banded owlet, is a species of butterfly belonging to the family Nymphalidae. As of January 2023, revision by Piovesan et al. 2023, suggests the species should be a junior synonym of Opsiphanes invirae (Hübner, [1808]), and the various former subspecies placed in other combinations or as synonyms.

== Description ==
The wingspan of female Opsiphanes cassina are roughly 70 millimetres (2.8 in) wide, while males' wingspans are smaller. The uppersides of their wings are dark brown, with yellow-orange bands crossing the forewings and the edges of the hindwings. The undersides of the wings are also brown, with some large eyespots. Adults of this species are only alive for about ten days, in which they have to feed, mate and lay their eggs.

The larvae are bright green, and possess two prong-like protrusions on their rear. Their diet includes Cocos nucifera, Livistona species, Acrocomia vinifera, Bactris guineensis, Erythrea salvadorensis and Roystonea regia. They are also dangerous defoliators of the oil palm.

== Distribution ==
This species occurs from Mexico to the Amazon basin.

== Subspecies ==
As of January 2023, the genus (and species) have undergone some revision by Piovesan et al. 2023, suggesting former subspecies below should have alternative placement, and that the nomenotypical subspecies is a junior synonym of Opsiphanes invirae (Hübner, [1808]), prior to this were:

- Opsiphanes cassina barkeri Bristow, 1991 (Ecuador)
- Opsiphanes cassina caliensis Bristow, 1991 (Colombia)
- Opsiphanes cassina cassina C. Felder & R. Felder, 1862 (Brazil)
- Opsiphanes cassina chiriquensis Stichel, 1902 (Nicaragua, Costa Rica, Panama) (=Opsiphanes cassina aiellae Bristow, 1991)
- Opsiphanes cassina fabricii (Boisduval, 1870) (Mexico, Guatemala, Costa Rica, Panama)
- Opsiphanes cassina merianae Stichel, 1902 (Suriname)
- Opsiphanes cassina milesi Bristow, 1991 (Brazil)
- Opsiphanes cassina notanda Stichel, 1904 (Peru)
- Opsiphanes cassina numatius Fruhstorfer, 1912 (Colombia)
