= Minerva owl butterfly =

Scientific classification
- Kingdom: Animalia
- Phylum: Arthropoda
- Class: Insecta
- Order: Lepidoptera
- Family: Nymphalidae
- Genus: Opsiphanes
- Species: O. blythekitzmillerae

Binomial name
- Opsiphanes blythekitzmillerae Austin & A. Warren, 2007

Species of butterfly

The minerva owl butterfly (Opsiphanes blythekitzmillerae) is a species of butterfly in the family Nymphalidae, the brush-footed butterflies. In November 2007 an anonymous online auction bidder paid US$40,800 for the naming rights to the butterfly. It was named after Margery Minerva Blythe Kitzmiller of the U.S. state of Ohio, who died in 1972. Researchers at the University of Florida discovered the new species in a butterfly collection at the Florida Museum of Natural History in 2007. It had been misidentified as an example of another species. The 4-inch butterfly is brown, white and black, and is found in the Mexican state of Sonora.
