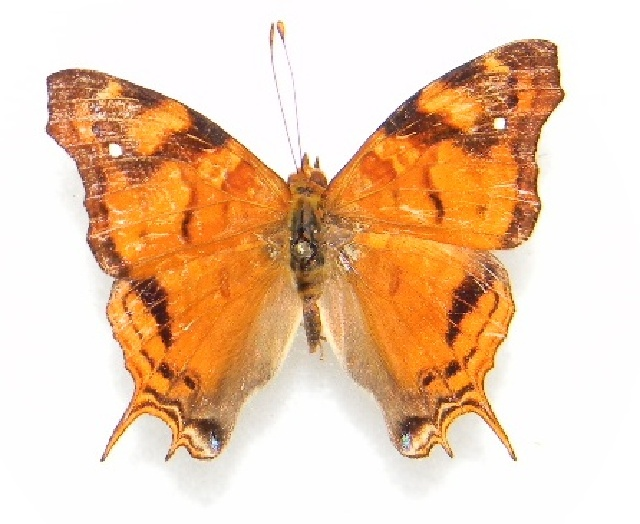
- Hypanartia paullus

Scientific classification
- Domain: Eukaryota
- Kingdom: Animalia
- Phylum: Arthropoda
- Class: Insecta
- Order: Lepidoptera
- Family: Nymphalidae
- Tribe: Nymphalini
- Genus: Hypanartia; Hübner, 1821

= Hypanartia =

Genus of insects

Hypanartia, commonly called mapwings, is a butterfly genus in the family Nymphalidae found from Mexico to South America.

Morphological data, mitochondrial and nuclear DNA reveal that Hypanartia is a possible sister clade a genera including: Polygonia, Aglais, Nymphalis, and more.

== Species ==
- Hypanartia bella (Fabricius, 1793) – Bella mapwing
- Hypanartia celestia Lamas, Willmott & Hall, 2001
- Hypanartia cinderella Lamas, Willmott & Hall, 2001 – Cinderella admiral
- Hypanartia charon (Hewitson, 1878)
- Hypanartia christophori Jasiñski, 1998
- Hypanartia dione (Latreille, 1813) – banded mapwing
- Hypanartia fassli Willmott, Hall & Lamas, 2001 – Colombian admiral
- Hypanartia godmanii (Bates, 1864) – Godman's mapwing, splendid mapwing
- Hypanartia kefersteini (Doubleday, 1847) – red mapwing
- Hypanartia lethe (Fabricius, 1793) – orange mapwing
- Hypanartia lindigii (C. & R. Felder, 1862)
- Hypanartia paullus (Fabricius, 1793) – Antillean mapwing
- Hypanartia splendida Rothschild, 1903
- Hypanartia trimaculata Willmott, Hall & Lamas, 2001 – reddish mapwing
