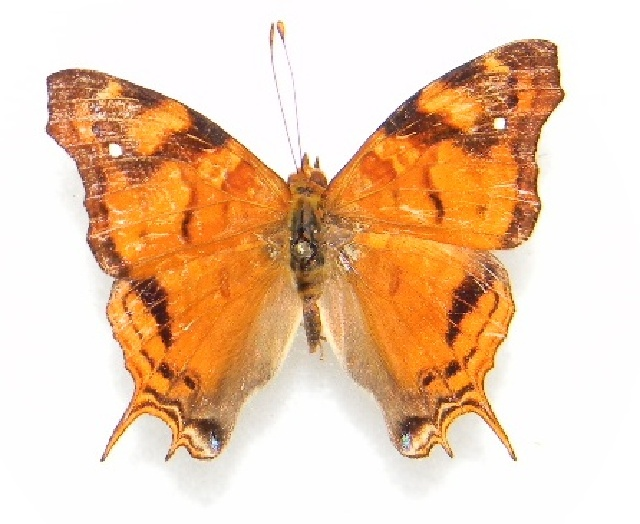

Scientific classification
- Domain: Eukaryota
- Kingdom: Animalia
- Phylum: Arthropoda
- Class: Insecta
- Order: Lepidoptera
- Family: Nymphalidae
- Genus: Hypanartia
- Species: H. paullus

Binomial name
- Hypanartia paullus (Fabricius, 1793)

Synonyms
- Papilio paullus Fabricius, 1793; Hypanartia tecmesia Hübner, [1823]

= Hypanartia paullus =

Antillean mapwing

Species of butterfly

Hypanartia paullus (Antillean mapwing) is a butterfly of the family Nymphalidae. It is found in Jamaica, Cuba, Hispaniola and Puerto Rico. It occurs in a wide variety of wooded habitats from sea level to 1,900 meters.

The length of the forewings is about 29 mm. Adults are on wing year round, but the peak flight period occurs between June and August.

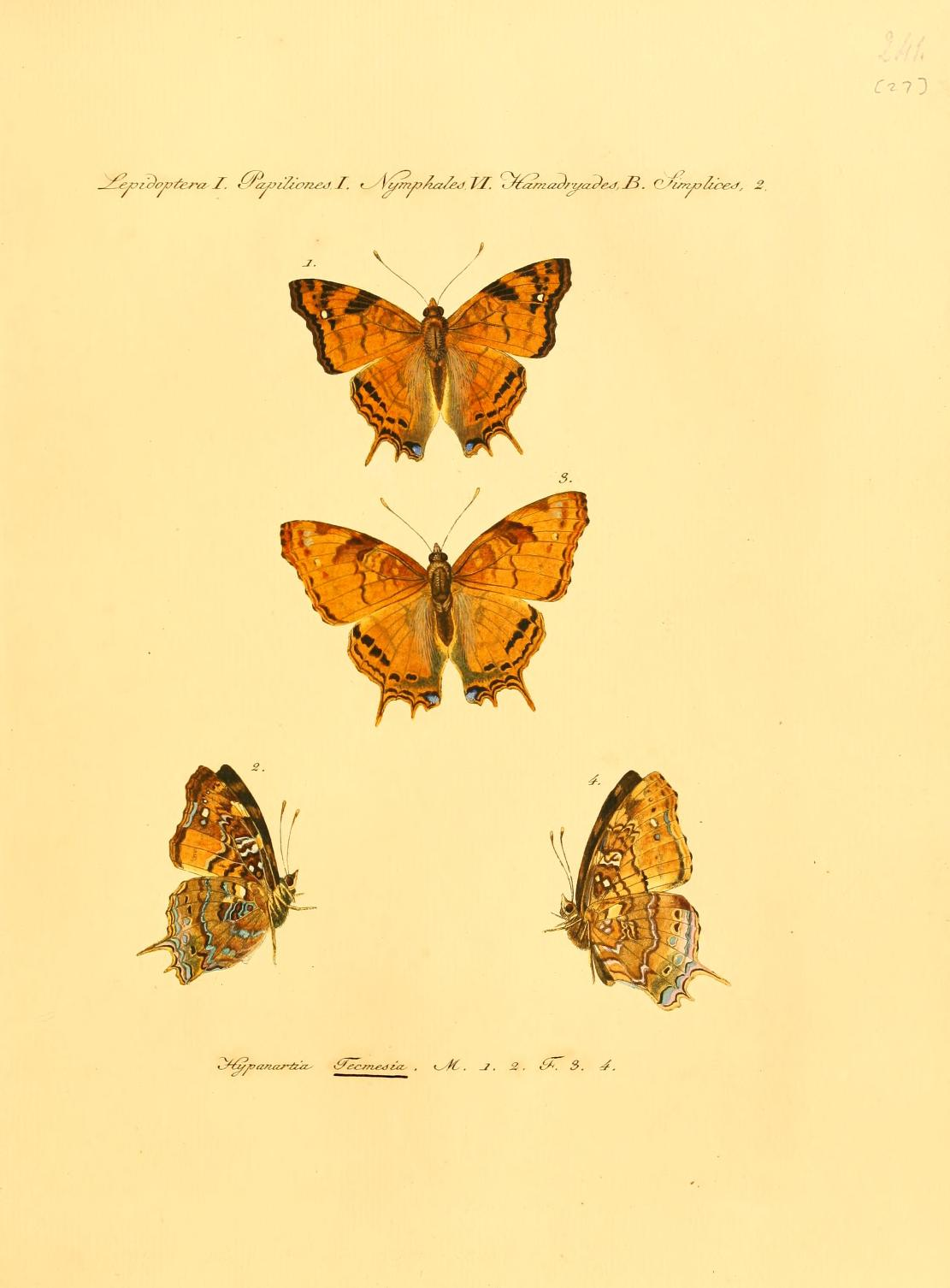
Plate from Jacob Hübner's Sammlung exotischer Schmetterlinge

The larvae feed on Trema micrantha and Piper species.
