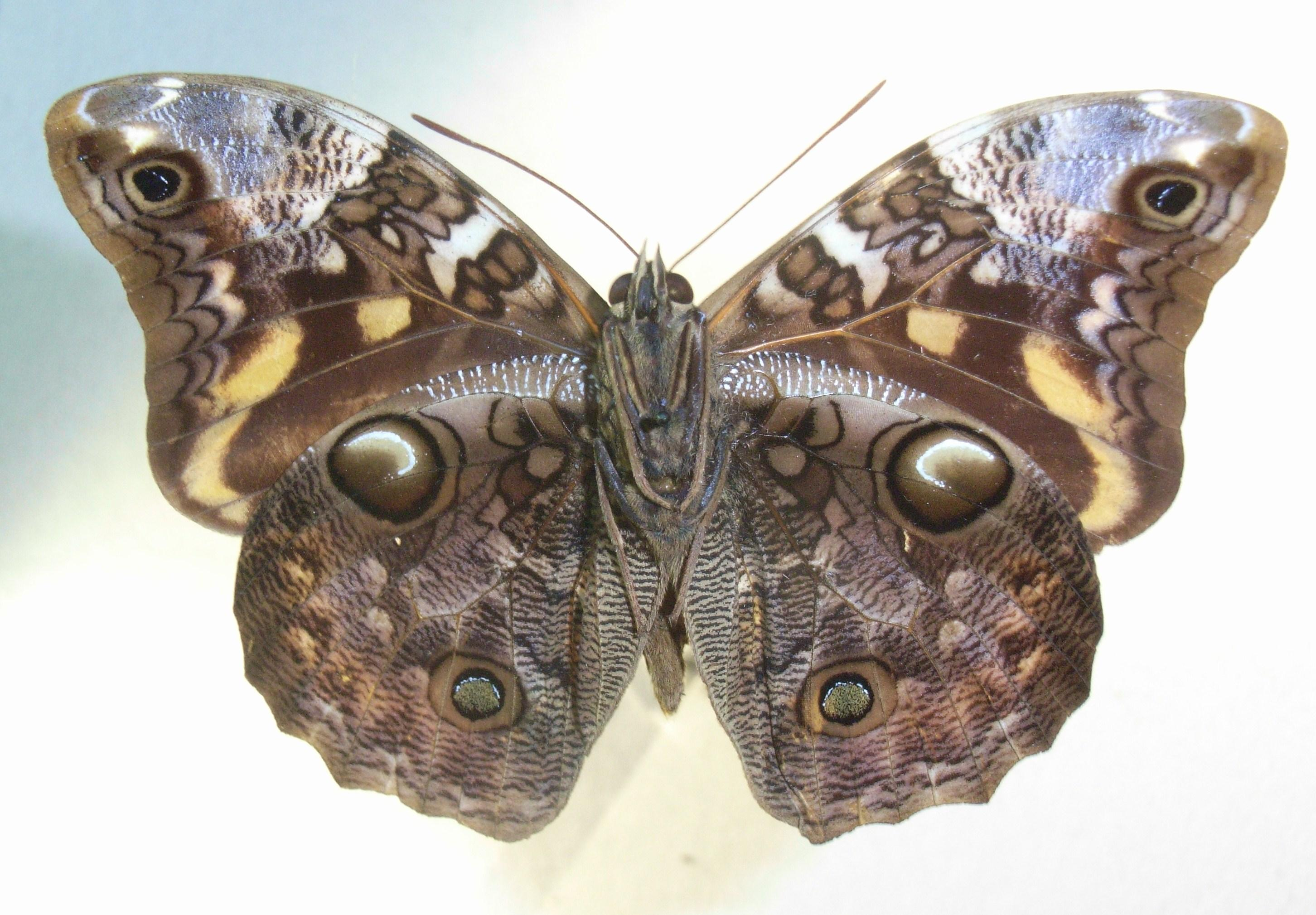
- Underside

Scientific classification
- Domain: Eukaryota
- Kingdom: Animalia
- Phylum: Arthropoda
- Class: Insecta
- Order: Lepidoptera
- Family: Nymphalidae
- Genus: Opsiphanes
- Species: O. sallei

Binomial name
- Opsiphanes sallei Doubleday, [1849]

= Opsiphanes sallei =

Species of butterfly

Opsiphanes sallei is a butterfly of the family Nymphalidae. It is found in Venezuela, Bolivia, Colombia and Peru.

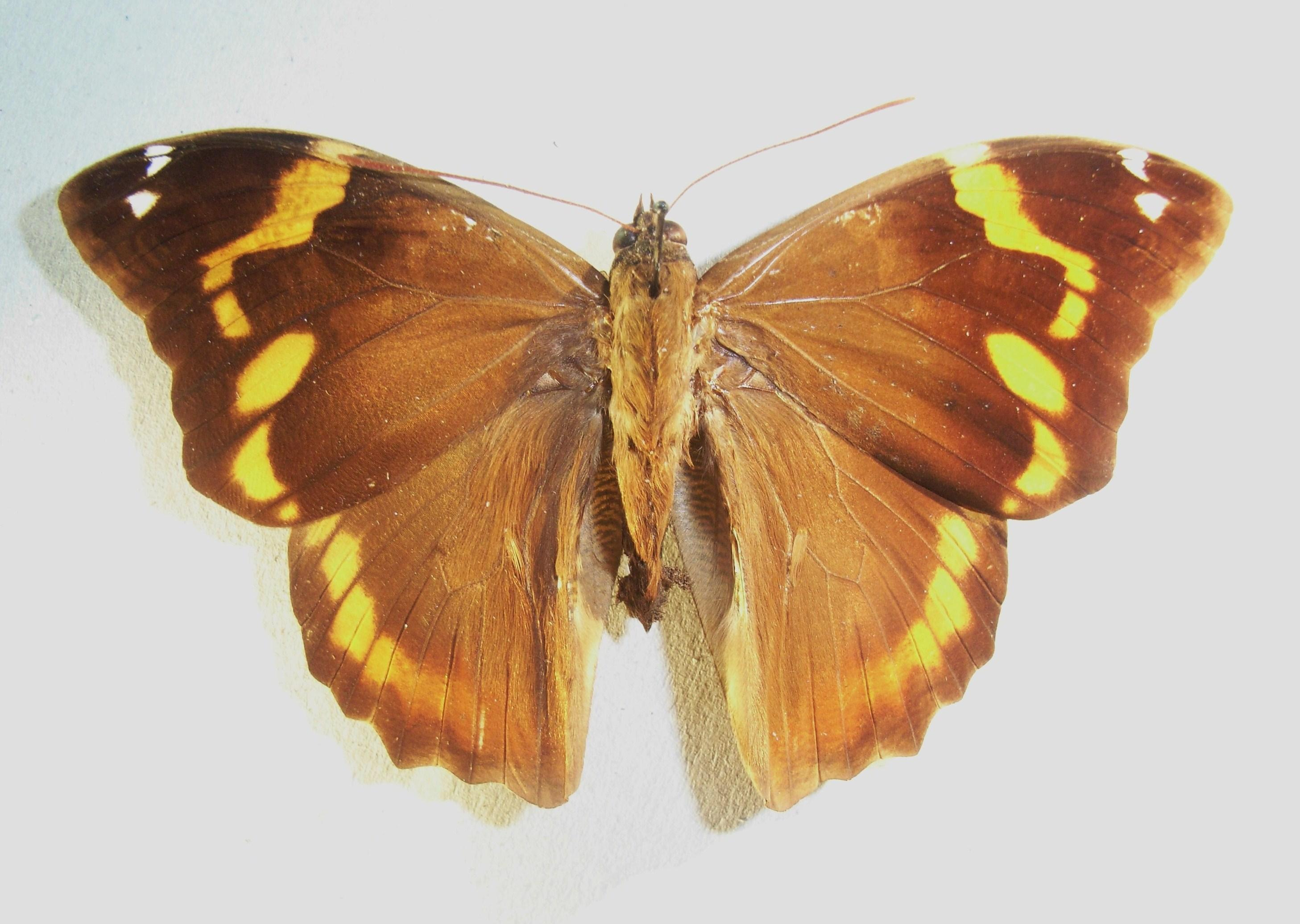
Upperside

== Subspecies ==
- Opsiphanes sallei sallei (Venezuela)
- Opsiphanes sallei nicandrus (Bolivia)
- Opsiphanes sallei colombiana (Colombia)
- Opsiphanes sallei kennerlyi (Peru)
