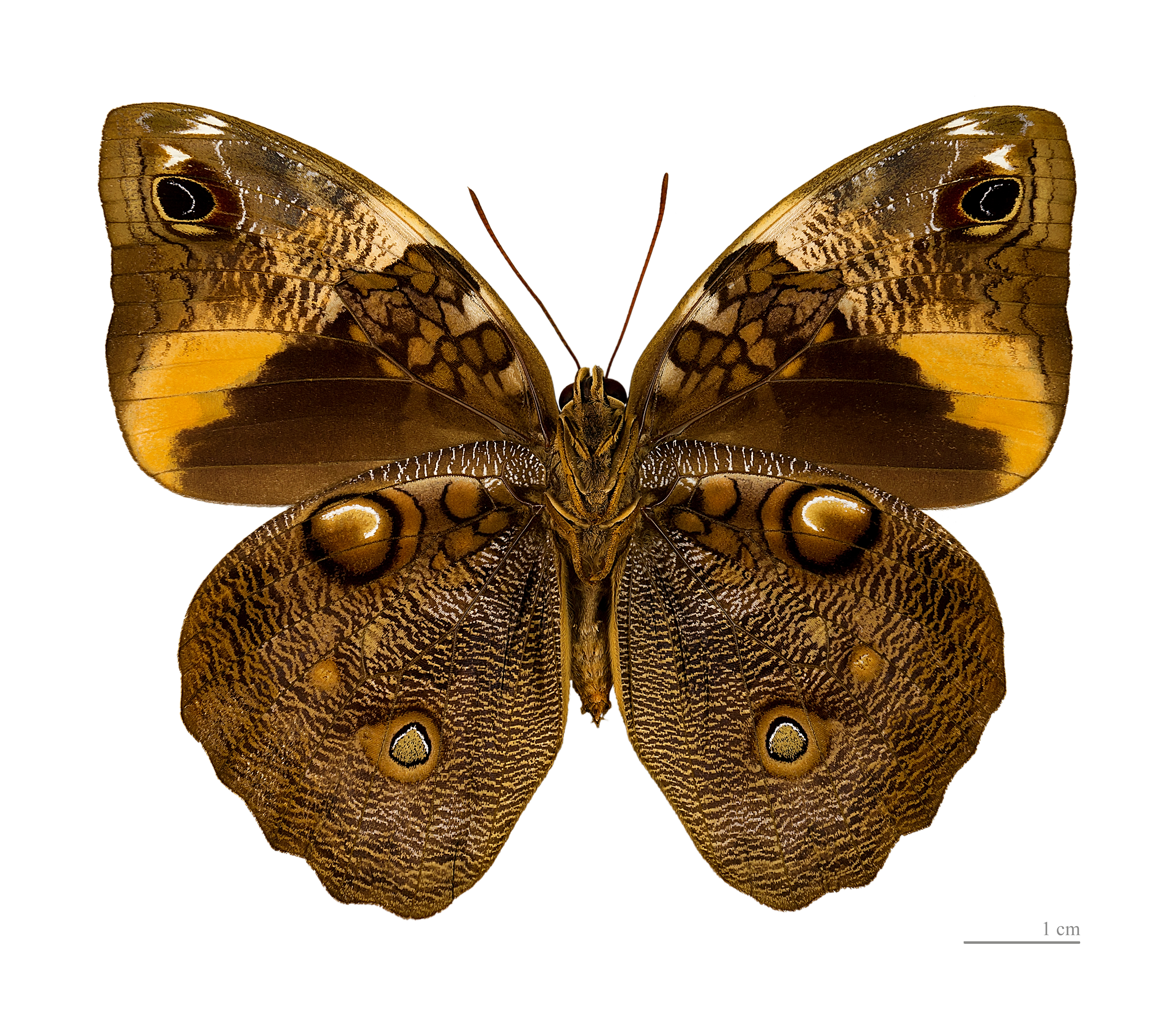
- Opsiphanes cassiae

Scientific classification
- Domain: Eukaryota
- Kingdom: Animalia
- Phylum: Arthropoda
- Class: Insecta
- Order: Lepidoptera
- Family: Nymphalidae
- Tribe: Brassolini
- Genus: Opsiphanes; Doubleday, [1849]

Synonyms
- Caligo Boisduval, 1870; Anthomantes Gistel, 1848

= Opsiphanes =

Genus of brush-footed butterflies

Opsiphanes is a genus of butterflies of the family Nymphalidae found from Mexico to South America.

== Species ==
Listed alphabetically:

- Opsiphanes blythekitzmillerae Austin & A. Warren, 2007 – Minerva owl butterfly
- Opsiphanes bogotanus Distant, 1875
- Opsiphanes boisduvallii Doubleday, [1849]
- Opsiphanes camena Staudinger, [1886]
- Opsiphanes cassiae (Linnaeus, 1758)
- Opsiphanes cassina C. & R. Felder, 1862 – split-banded owlet
- Opsiphanes invirae (Hübner, [1808])
- Opsiphanes mutatus Stichel, 1902
- Opsiphanes quiteria (Stoll, [1780])
- Opsiphanes sallei Doubleday, [1849]
- Opsiphanes tamarindi C. & R. Felder, 1861
- Opsiphanes zelotes Hewitson, 1873
