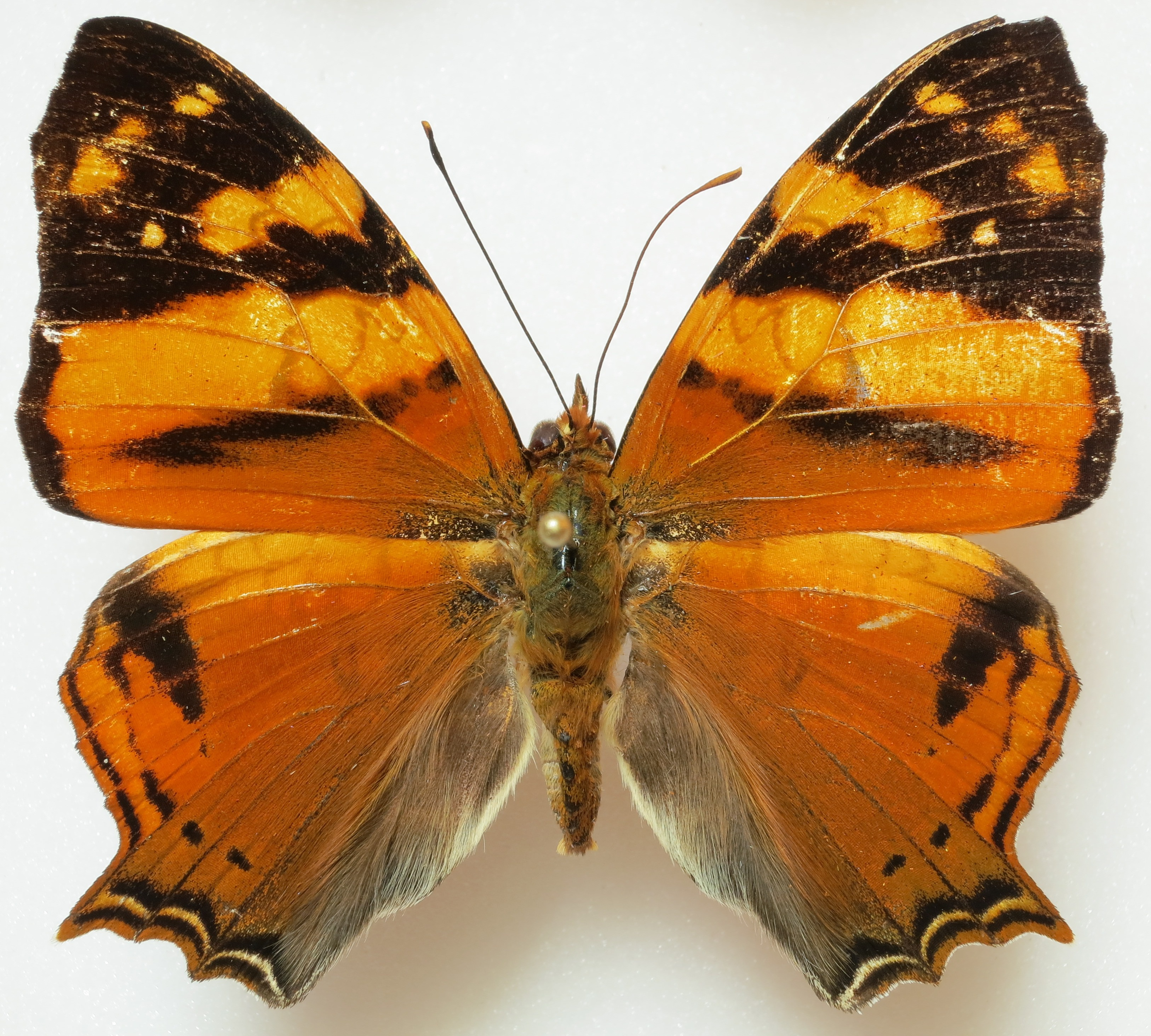
- Upperside
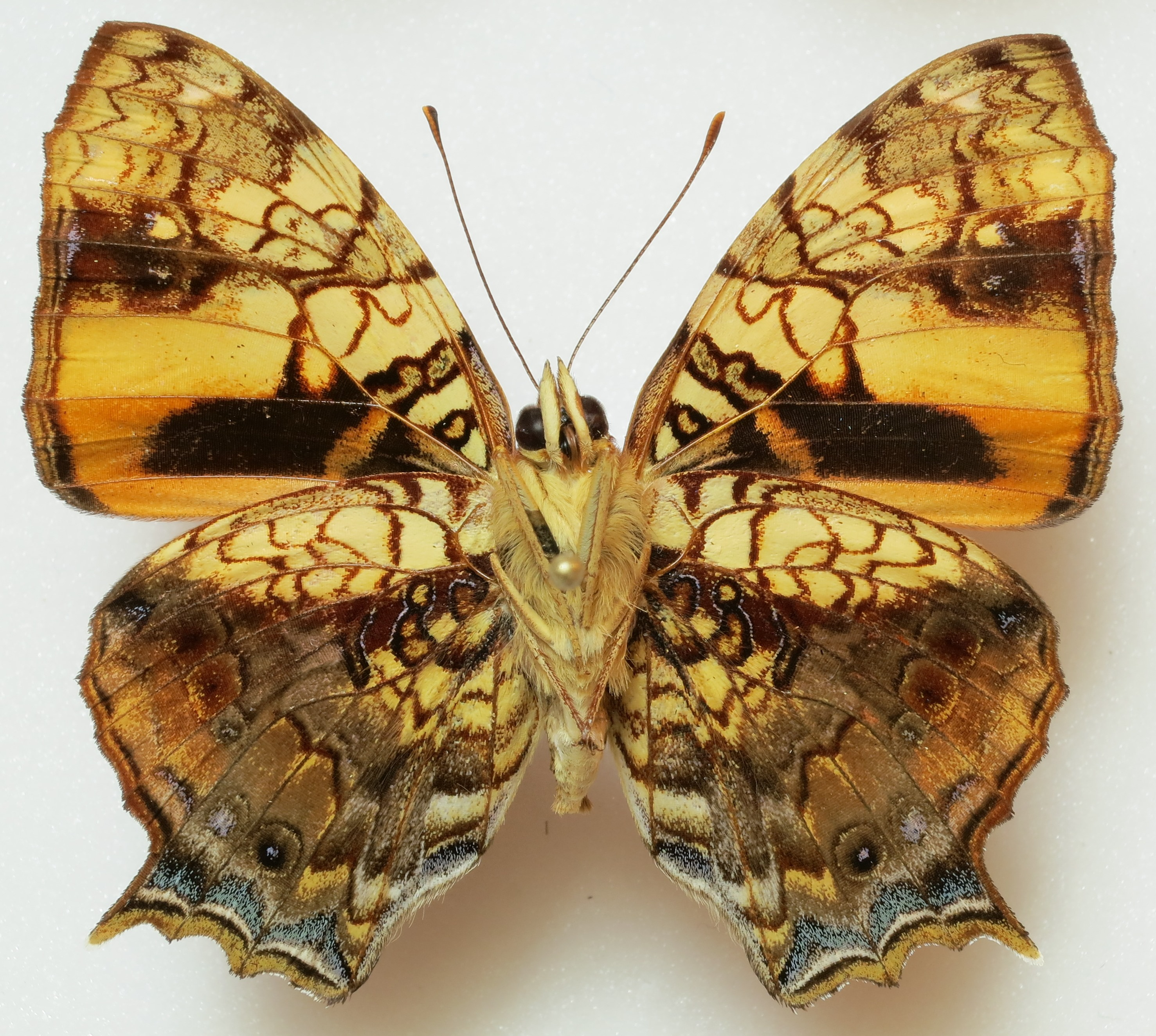
- Underside

Scientific classification
- Kingdom: Animalia
- Phylum: Arthropoda
- Clade: Pancrustacea
- Class: Insecta
- Order: Lepidoptera
- Family: Nymphalidae
- Genus: Hypanartia
- Species: H. lethe

Binomial name
- Hypanartia lethe (Fabricius, 1793)

Synonyms
- Papilio lethe Fabricius, 1793; Hypanartia demonica Hübner, 1821; Eurema lethe Godman & Salvin, 1882

= Hypanartia lethe =

Species of butterfly

Hypanartia lethe, the orange admiral or orange mapwing, is a butterfly of the family Nymphalidae.

== Description ==
Hypanartia lethe has a wingspan of about 40–50 millimetres (1.6–2.0 in). Forewings are black with orange-brown spots and an orange-brown fascia composed by a few blotches. Hindwings are orange brown, with a row of black spots in the marginal area and a black narrow strip in the submarginal area near the apex. The underside of the wings shows an ornate pattern and a pale brown coloration resembling the contour lines of a topographic map (hence the common name orange mapwing). Adults have two hindwing tails of variable length.

== Biology ==
Larvae feed on Phenax, Boehmeria, Celtis, Sponia and Trema micrantha.

== Distribution and habitat ==
This common and widespread species can be found in Texas, Mexico - Peru, Trinidad, Venezuela, Argentina, Paraguay, Uruguay and Brazil. These butterflies have a mountain range and prefers forest habitats at an elevation of 300–1,700 metres (980–5,580 ft) above sea level.

== Gallery ==
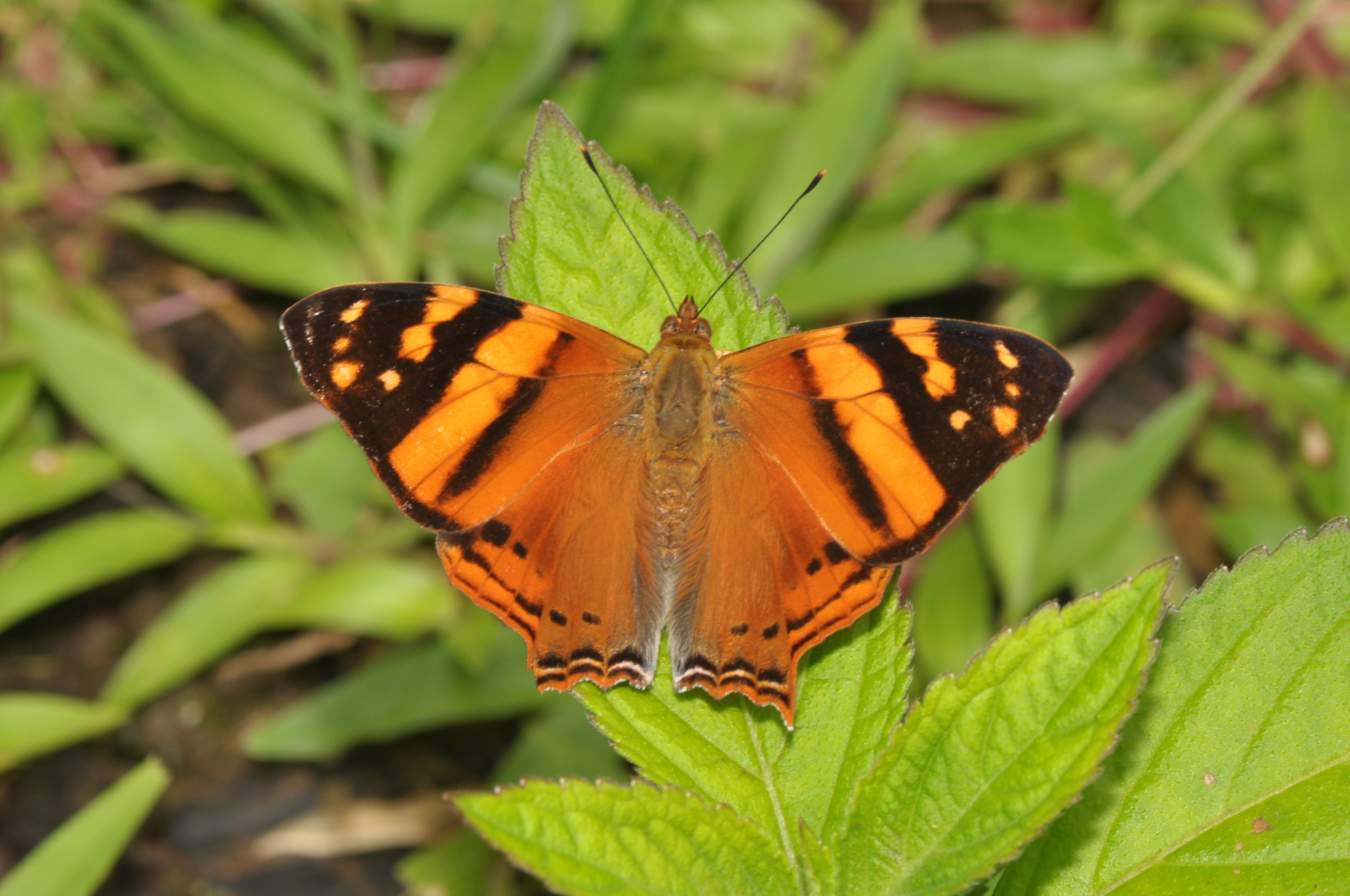

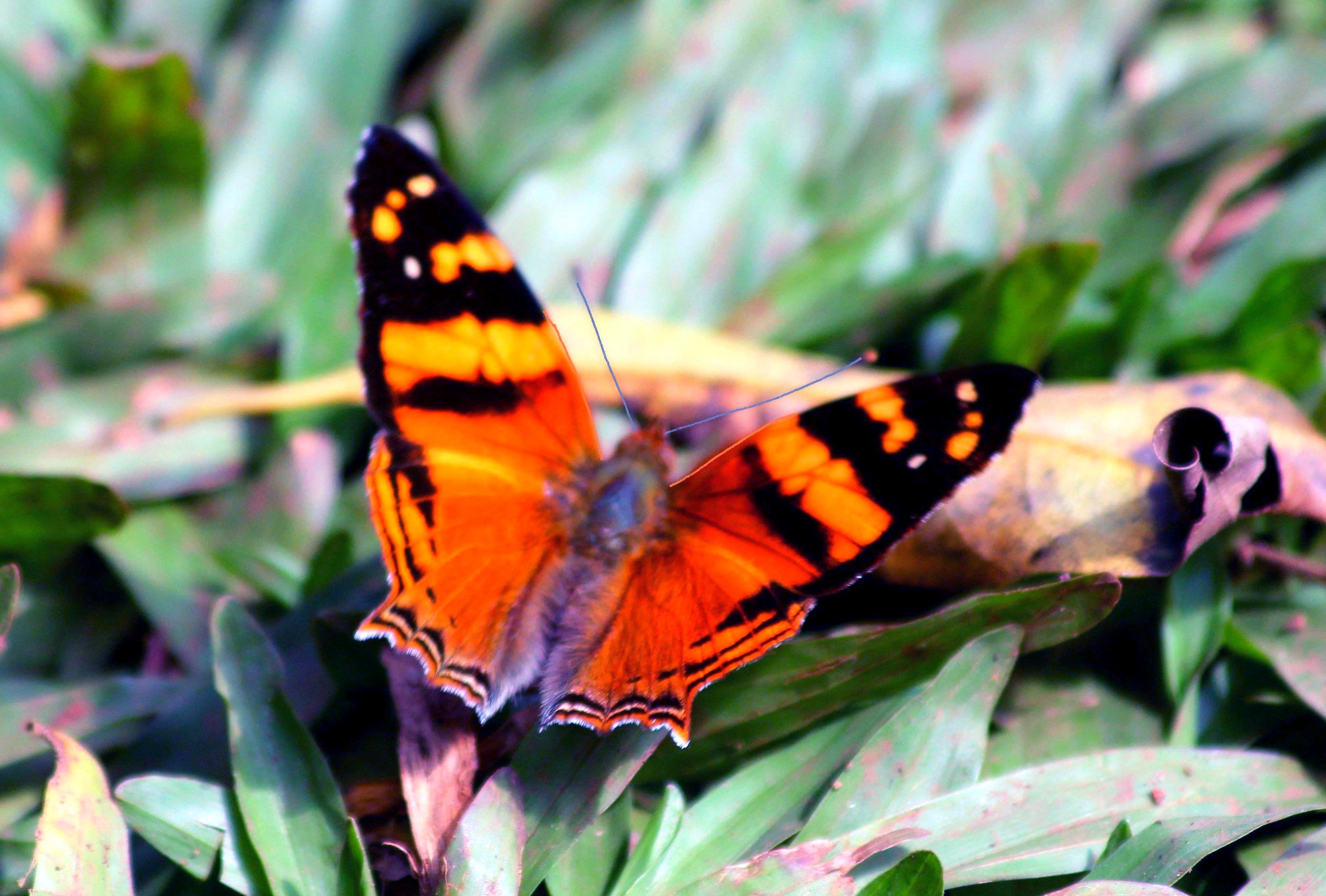

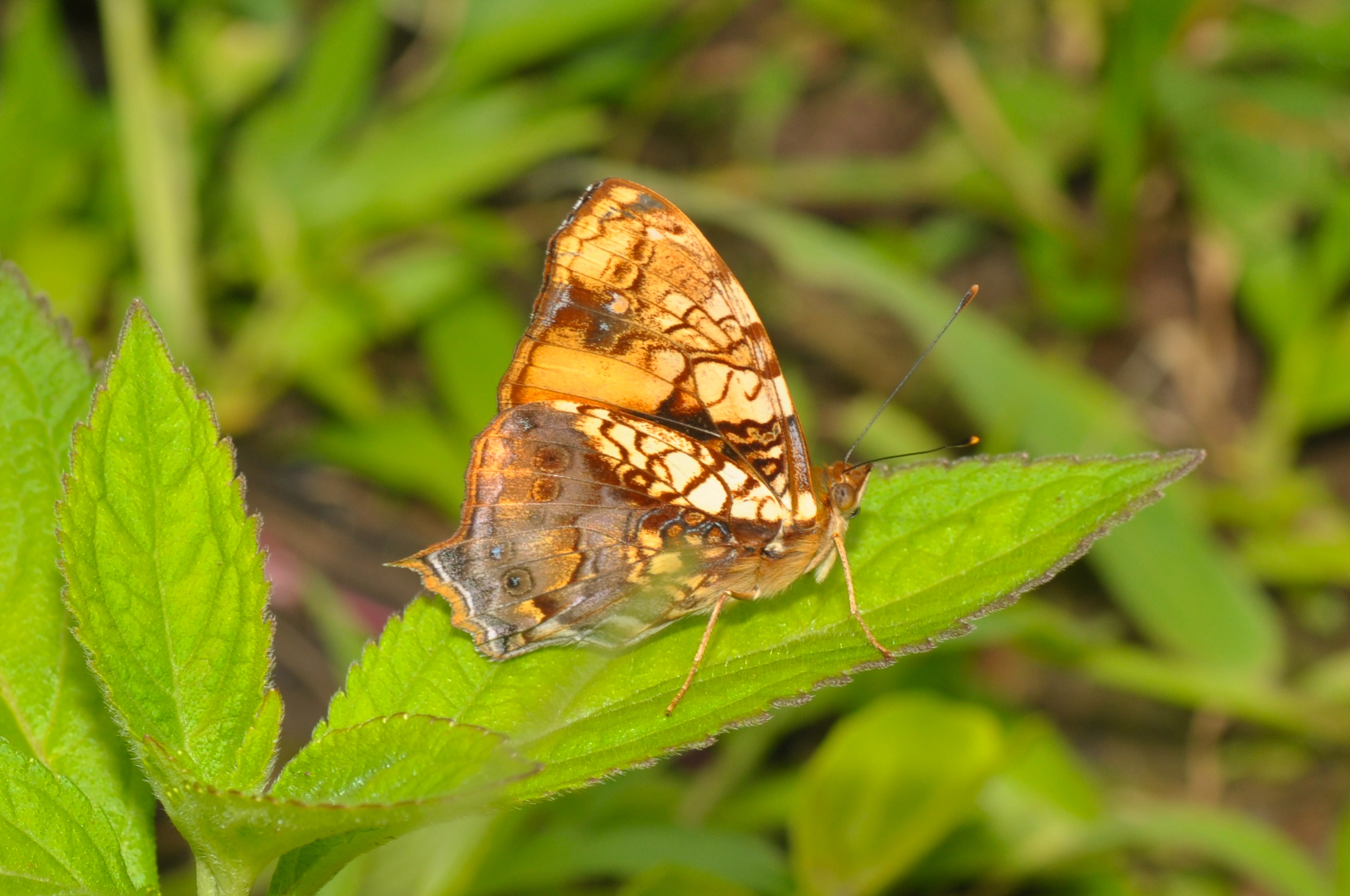
