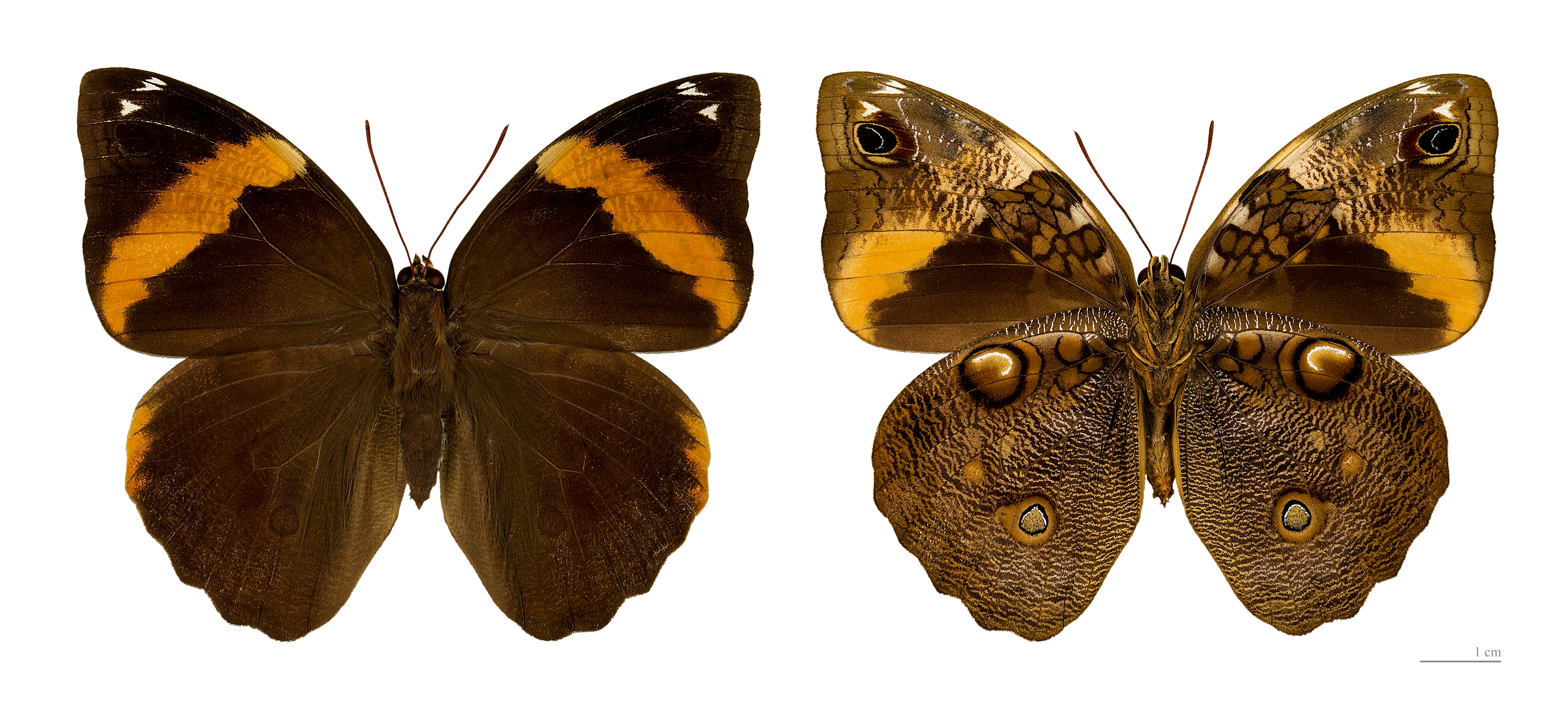

Scientific classification
- Kingdom: Animalia
- Phylum: Arthropoda
- Class: Insecta
- Order: Lepidoptera
- Family: Nymphalidae
- Genus: Opsiphanes
- Species: O. cassiae

Binomial name
- Opsiphanes cassiae (Linnaeus, 1758)

= Opsiphanes cassiae =

Species of butterfly

Opsiphanes cassiae is a species of butterfly that contains several subspecies.

== Taxonomy ==
Opsiphanes cassiae contains the following subspecies:

- Opsiphanes cassiae cassiae (Linnaeus, 1758) (= crameri C. Felder & R. Felder, 1862)
- Opsiphanes cassiae incolumis Stichel, 1904
- Opsiphanes cassiae tamarindi C. Felder & R. Felder, 1861

As of January 2023, the genus (and species) have undergone some revision by Piovesan et al. 2023, suggesting the following changes:

- Opsiphanes crameri C. Felder & R. Felder, 1862 as a synonym of Opsiphanes cassiae cassiae (Linnaeus, 1758), contra "Butterflies of America" listing Opsiphanes cassiae crameri C. Felder & R. Felder, 1862).
- Opsiphanes cassiae tamarindi C. Felder & R. Felder, 1861 contra "Butterflies of America" listing Opsiphanes tamarindi incolumis Stichel, 1904).
- Opsiphanes bogotanus castaneus Stichel, 1904, contra "Butterflies of America" listing Opsiphanes cassiae castaneus Stichel, 1904.
- Opsiphanes mexicana Bristow, 1991, contra "Butterflies of America" listing Opsiphanes cassiae mexicana Bristow, 1991.
