= Palm and Cycad Arboretum =

Arboretum in Jacksonville, Florida, US

- Interactive map of Palm and Cycad Arboretum
- Type: Botanical garden
- Location: Jacksonville, Florida
- Coordinates: 30°17′29.4″N 81°30′35.6″W

The Palm and Cycad Arboretum at the Florida State College at Jacksonville is located on the south campus at 11901 Beach Boulevard, Jacksonville, Florida, United States. This is an outdoor area next to the G building, a large three-story complex in the middle of campus that houses the library and other facilities. There is also a biologically diverse area of larger trees and mid-growth brush in an immediate westerly direction to this area. As the Arboretum is an open area, there are no specific set hours, and its use is free and available to all students and visitors.

== Collection ==
Collections include Acoelorraphe wrightii, Allagoptera arenaria, Arenga engleri, Braea armataz, Brahea brandegeei, Chamaedorea microspadix, Chamaedorea radicalis, Chamaerops humil, Cycas revoluta, Dioon edule, Dioon spinolusum, Livistona drudei, Livistona mariae, Livistona speciosa, Phoenix reclinata, Phoenix theophrasti, Sabal mauritiiformis, Trithrinax acanthocoma, and Zamia pumila.

== See also ==
- List of botanical gardens in the United States
