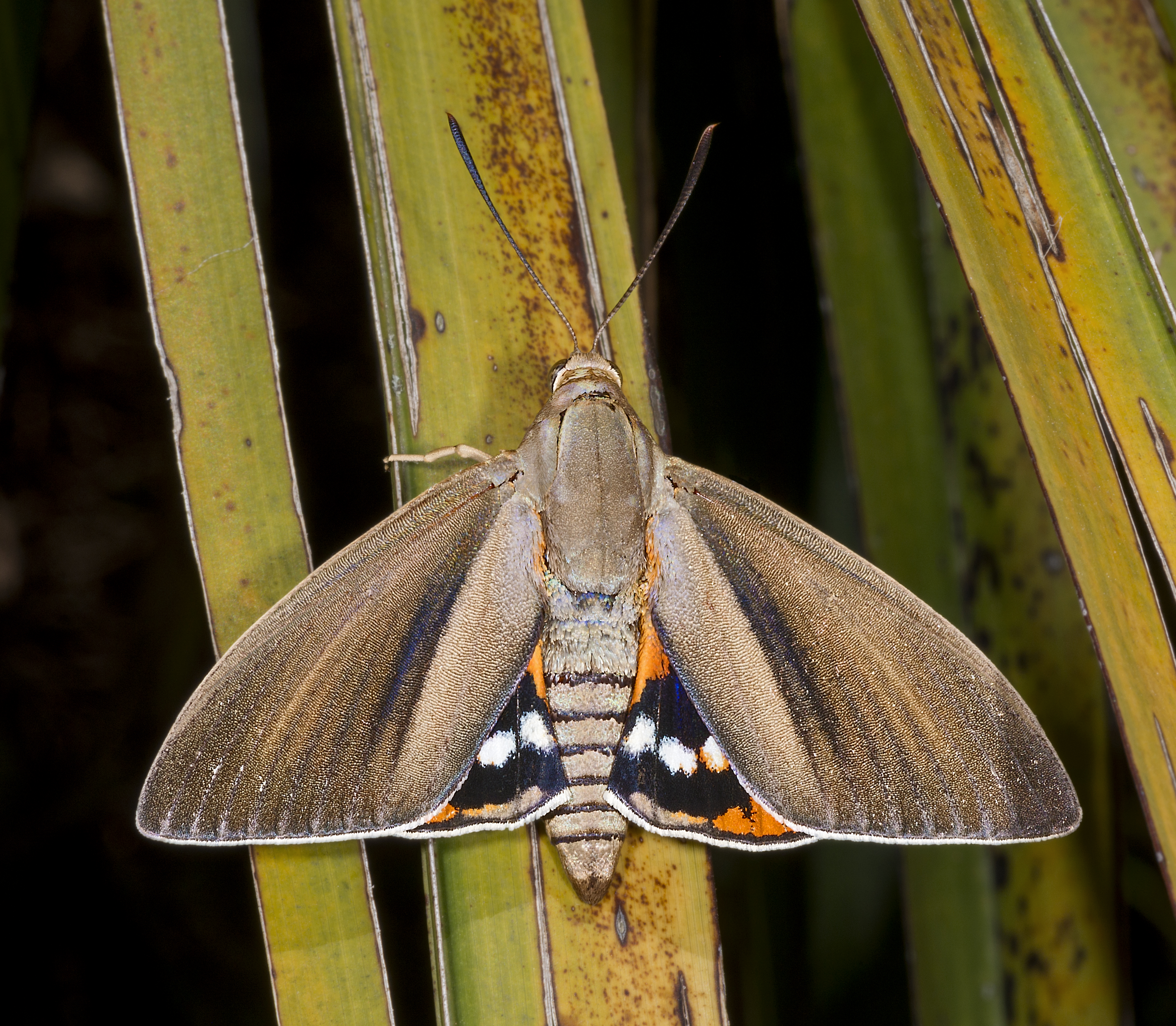
- P. archon male
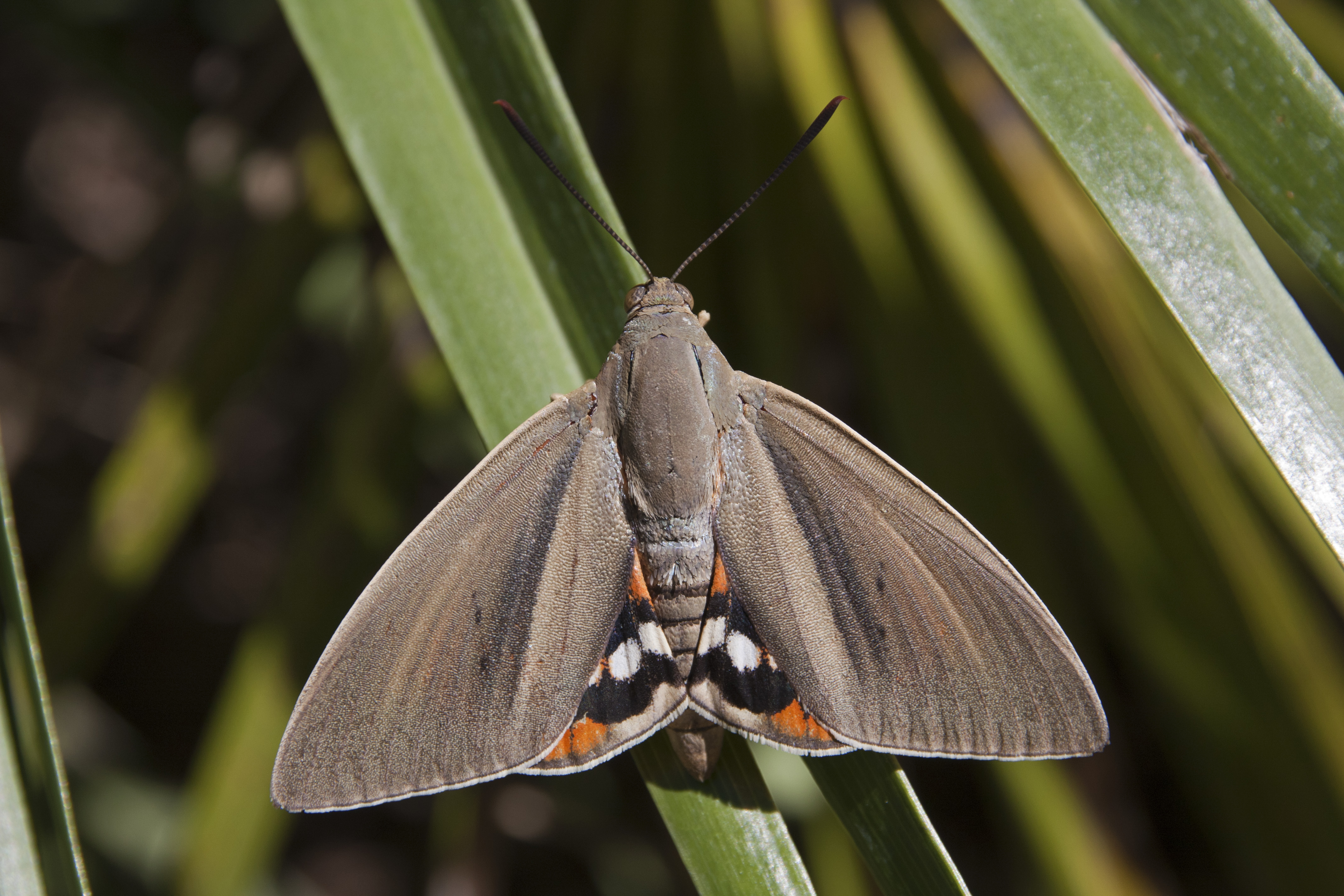
- P. archon female

Scientific classification
- Kingdom: Animalia
- Phylum: Arthropoda
- Clade: Pancrustacea
- Class: Insecta
- Order: Lepidoptera
- Family: Castniidae
- Subfamily: Castniinae
- Tribe: Gazerini
- Genus: Paysandisia; Houlbert, 1912
- Species: P. archon

Binomial name
- Paysandisia archon (Burmeister, 1880)

Synonyms
- Castnia archon Burmeister, 1879; Castnia josepha Oberthür, 1914

= Paysandisia archon =

Species of moth

Paysandisia archon is a moth of the family Castniidae. It is native to Uruguay and central Argentina and has been accidentally introduced to Europe, where it is spreading rapidly. It is considered the only member of the genus Paysandisia.

German naturalist Hermann Burmeister described the species in 1879 as Castnia archon.

This is a very large moth with a wingspan of 90–110 mm. The forewings are dark green with brown streaking, the hindwings are bright red with bold black and white markings. The females, generally larger than the males, are easily recognized by the prominent ovipositor. Like other castniids, this species flies by day and has clubbed antennae and is easily mistaken for a butterfly. The adults fly from June to September.

The larva is whitish and maggot-like and feeds in the stems and trunks of palms (see list below for recorded food plants). In its natural range, the damage done by the larvae is unobtrusive and the species is not considered a pest but the species is causing increasing concern in Europe because of the sometimes fatal damage being caused to native and exotic palms. The species pupates in a cocoon incorporating palm fibres within the larval gallery.

== Invasive species ==
Since arriving in the Southern France in the mid-1990s (probably in mature specimens of Trithrinax from Argentina), it has spread along the Mediterranean coast to parts of Spain, Italy, Greece and Cyprus and it is feared that without effective control, it could spread to areas where palms grow throughout the region. (It is absent from Albania but global warming may make it suitable habitat in 2020–2039.)

One has also been reported from England, in West Sussex in 2002 and 2009 in Northern Ireland. Both UK introductions were eradicated. A survey shows it is absent from the Netherlands. The species was first reported on Russia's Black Sea coast in 2014, and by 2016 had been implicated in the death of over 200 palm trees in Sochi.

== Recorded food plants ==
=== Natural range ===
- Trithrinax campestris

=== Introduced range ===
- Chamaerops humilis
- Trachycarpus fortunei
- Livistona spp., including:
  - L. chinensis
  - L. decipiens
  - L. saribus
- Phoenix spp., including:
  - P. canariensis
  - P. dactylifera
  - P. reclinata
- Sabal
- Trachycarpus fortunei
- Washingtonia spp., including:
  - W. filifera

== Control Methods ==
The use of entomopathogenic nematodes such as Steinernema carpocapsae: effective against butterfly larvae when they are inside the palm tree, these microscopic worms infect the larvae by causing septicemia. This environmentally friendly method has variable effectiveness, depending on climatic conditions, pest population density, and the frequency of treatments.

Certain strains of Bacillus thuringiensis (particularly Bt kurstaki) are used to specifically target butterfly larvae. Treatment is generally carried out by spraying egg-laying areas or the crown of the palm tree at a specific stage of the insect’s life cycle. This method is environmentally friendly but has limited efficacy over time, as the product is sensitive to UV rays and wash-off (rain or irrigation). It is less effective at advanced stages of infestation (when larvae are deeply embedded in the trunk).

The use of plant protection products based on entomopathogenic spores of Beauveria bassiana allows for the control of this pest but comes with certain risks: it should not be used in the presence of bees, nor by individuals who are severely immunocompromised or undergoing immunosuppressive treatment. The re-entry interval is 6 hours for outdoor applications and 8 hours for indoor environments. Beauveria bassiana requires specific humidity and temperature conditions to develop effectively. In hot and dry climates—often typical of areas where palm trees are grown—its effectiveness drops significantly. The fungus also degrades rapidly under sunlight, which limits the duration of protection after application.

Trichogramma wasps are also used; their larvae develop at the expense of butterfly eggs.

Finally, the use of specially designed protective nets is a physical, preventive, and highly effective control method. When tailored to the morphology of the palm and the biology of the pest, these nets create an impenetrable mechanical barrier that prevents adult females from laying eggs in the crowns of palm trees.

This technique offers several advantages:

- Immediate and continuous preventive effectiveness without chemical or biological treatment, by preventing egg-laying;
- Curative effectiveness by preventing emerging butterflies from escaping;
- Reduced need for human intervention;
- No environmental impact;
- Adaptability to different palm species and sizes.

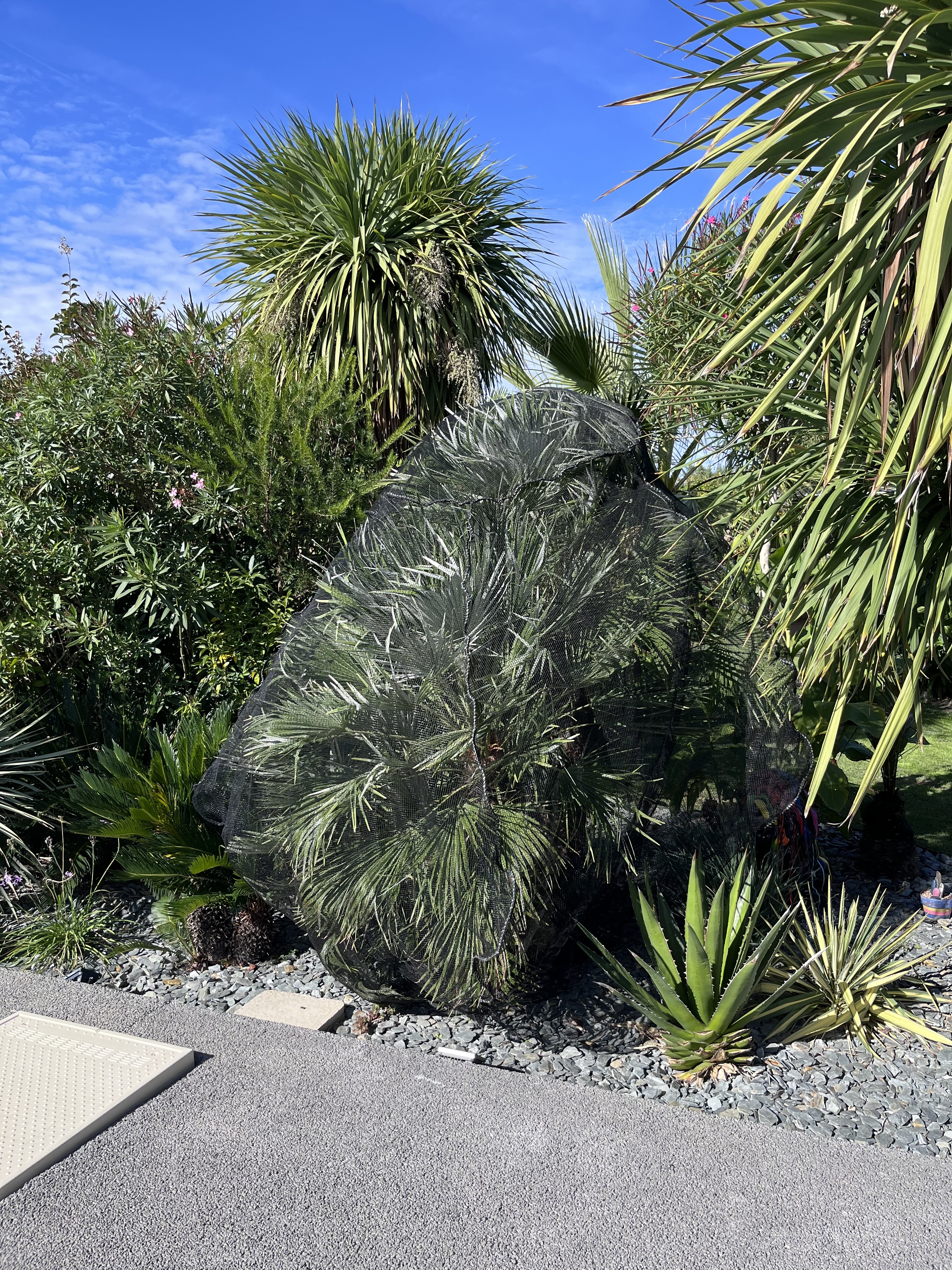
Control net (Vigipalm® type) installed on a clump of Chamaerops humilis, a palm species particularly targeted by Paysandisia archon.

Adults use semiochemical compounds to locate each other and identify their host plants in the environment. The use of odours to control the pest has been the subject of several studies, but none have produced conclusive results.

== Gallery ==
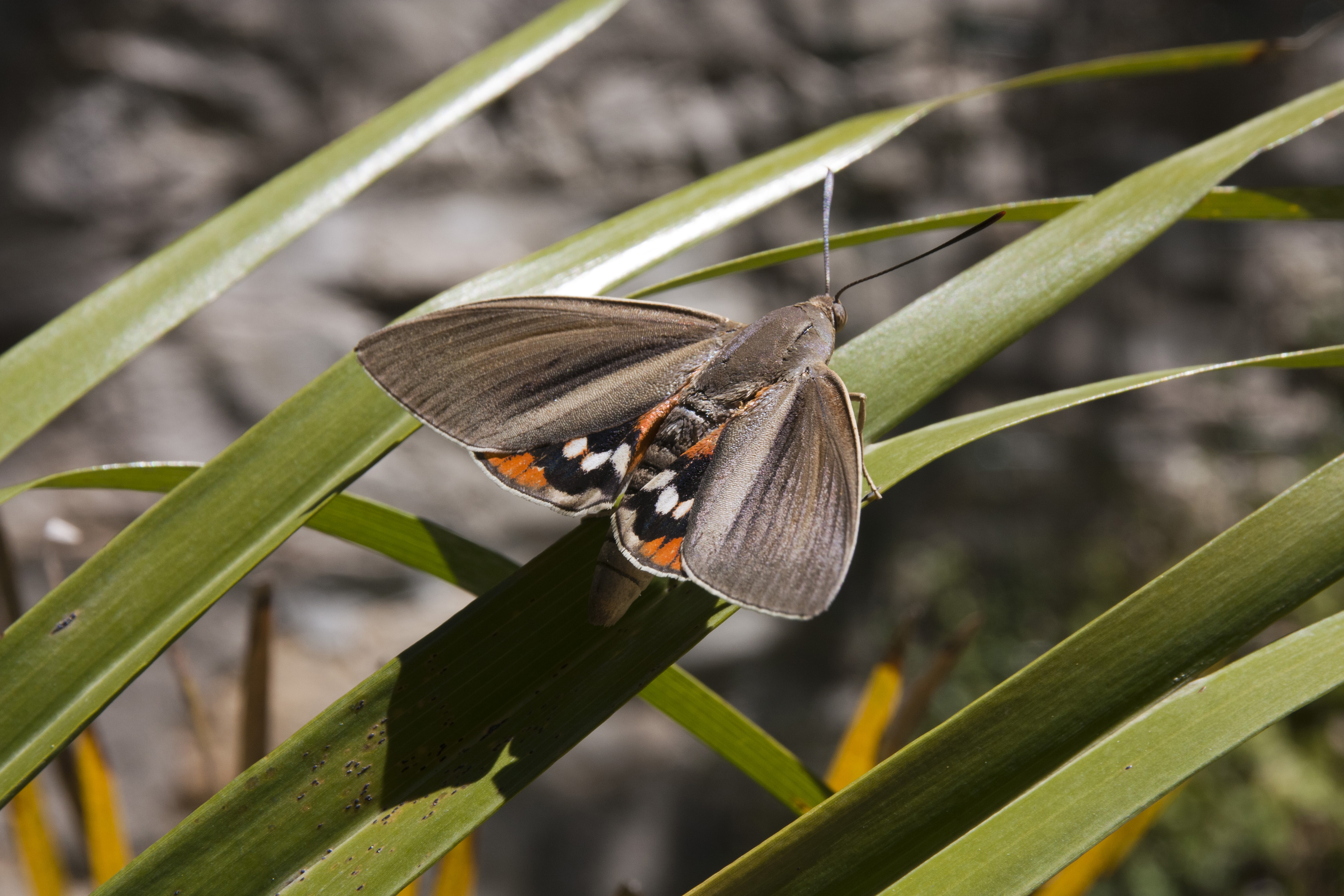
Habitat

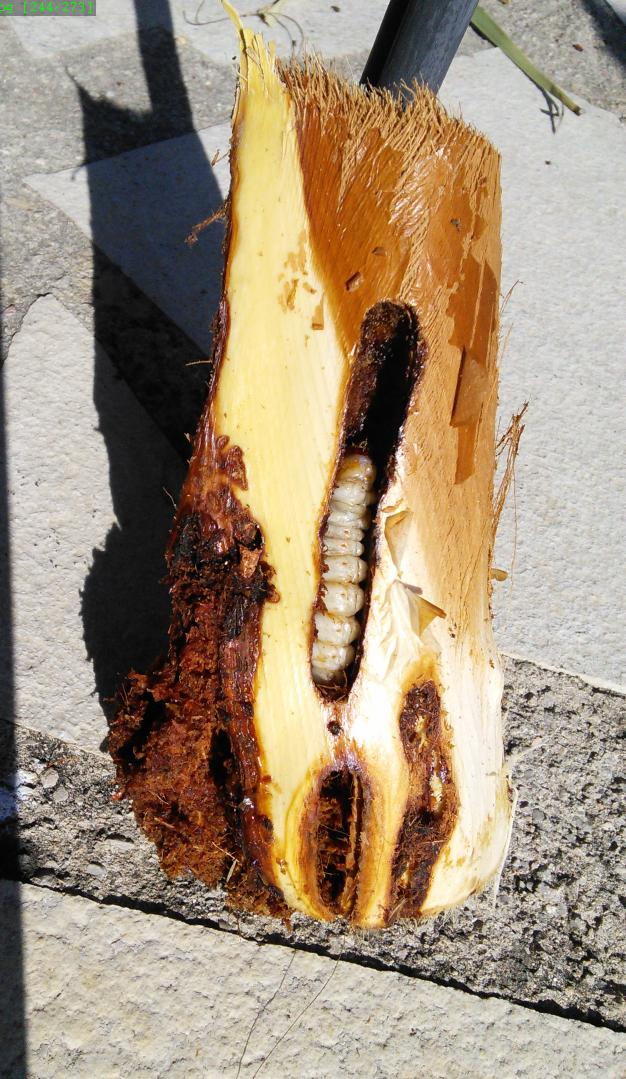
Larva (80 mm) of Paysandisia archon in its gallery

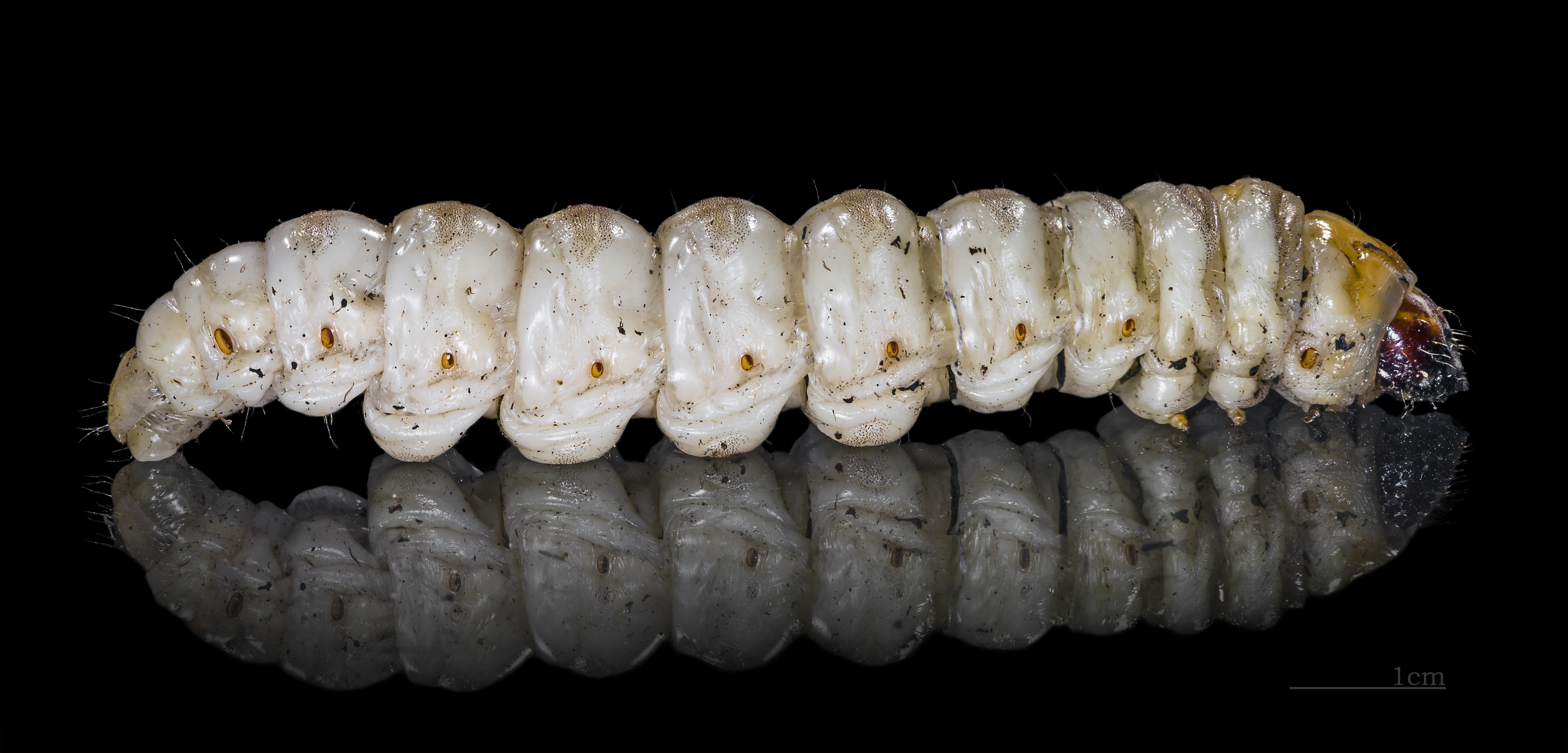
Larva

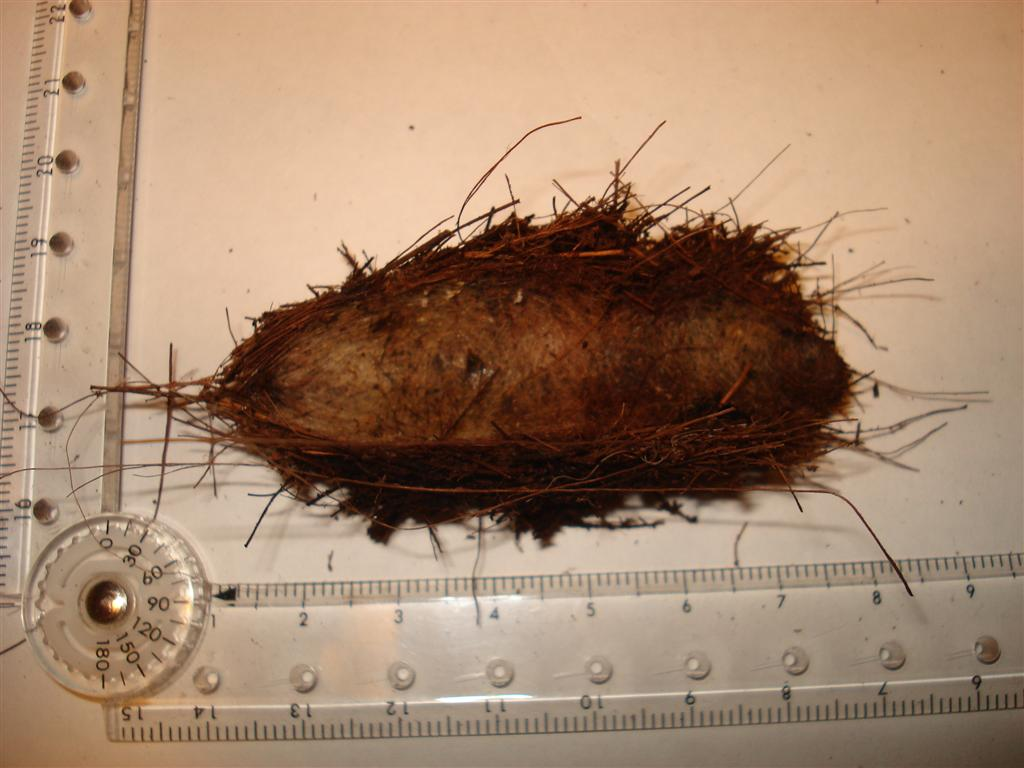
Cocoon

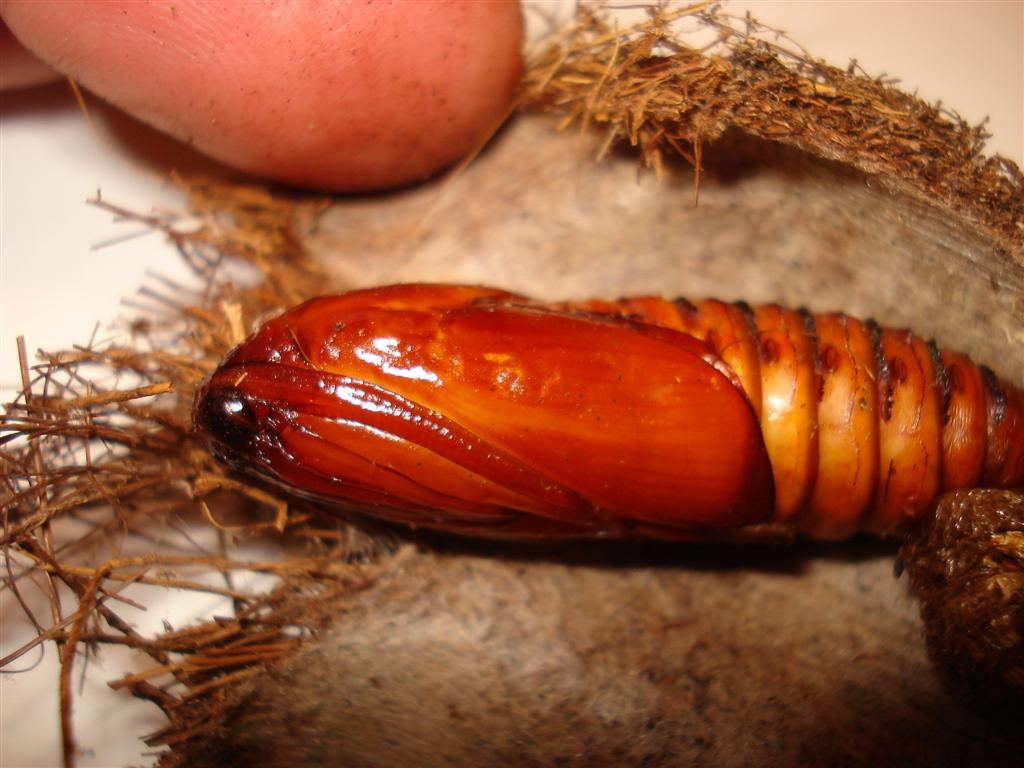
Pupa

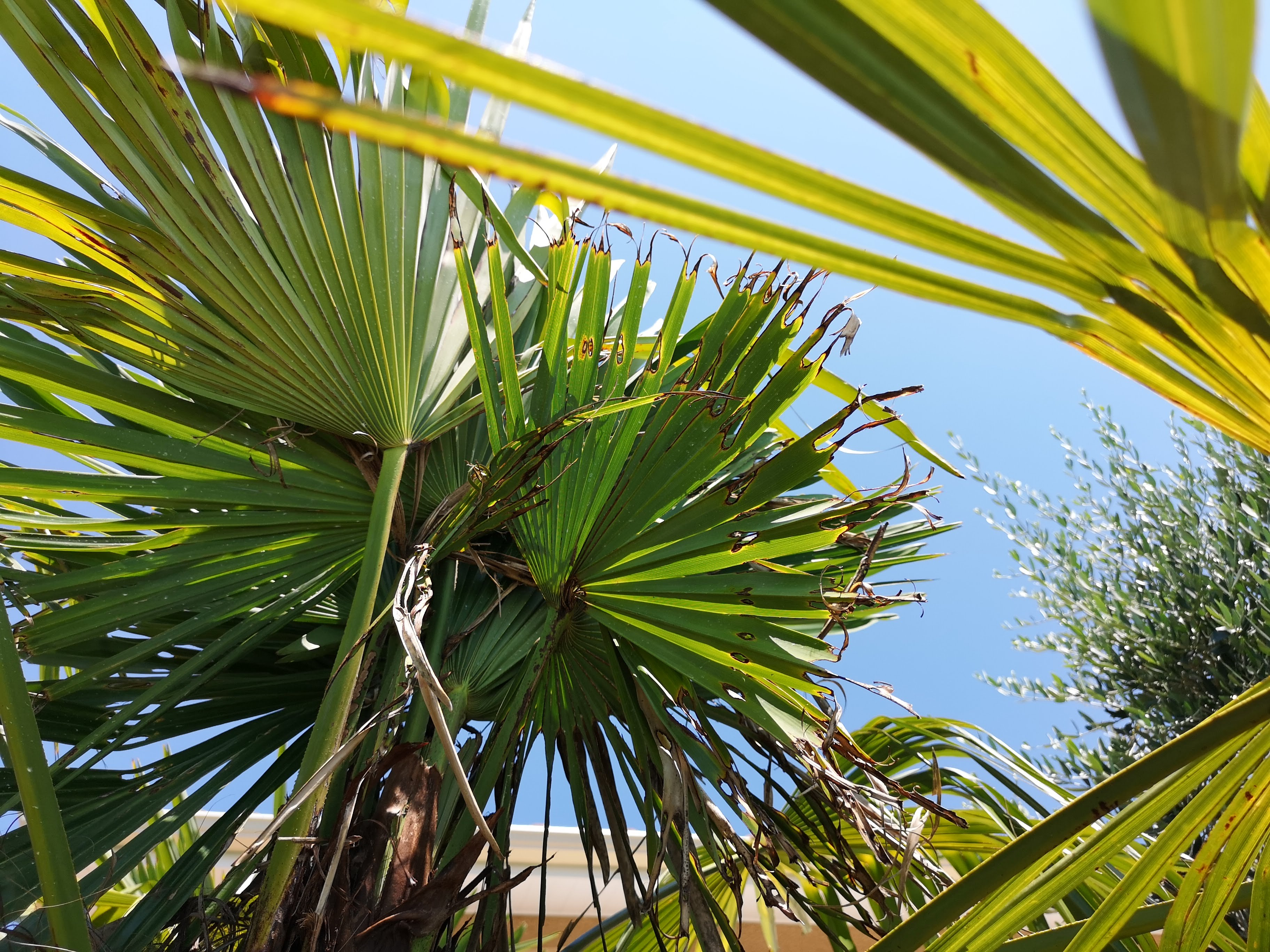
Damage on palm trees by Paysandisia archon larvae

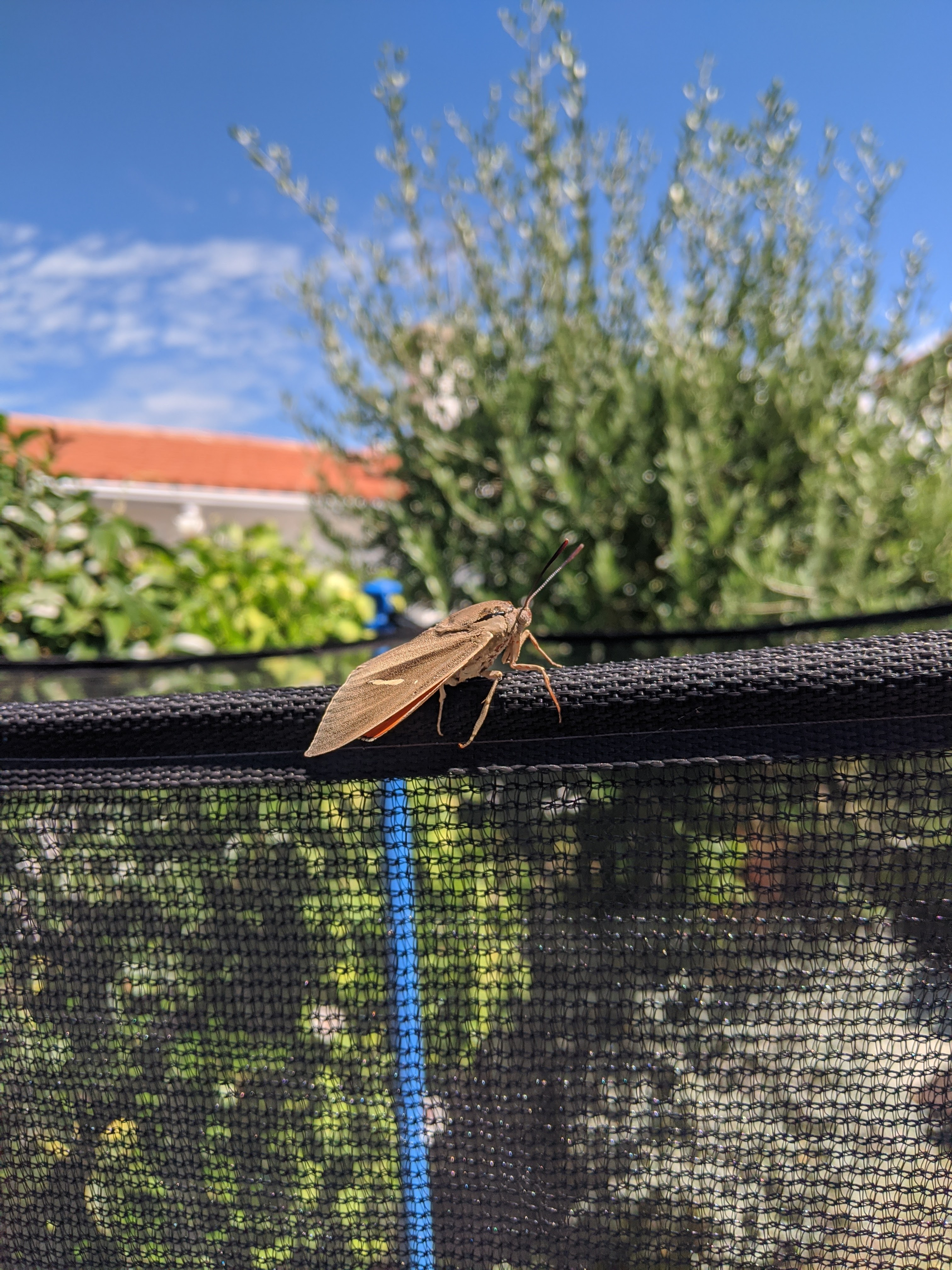
Paysandisia archon in South West France
