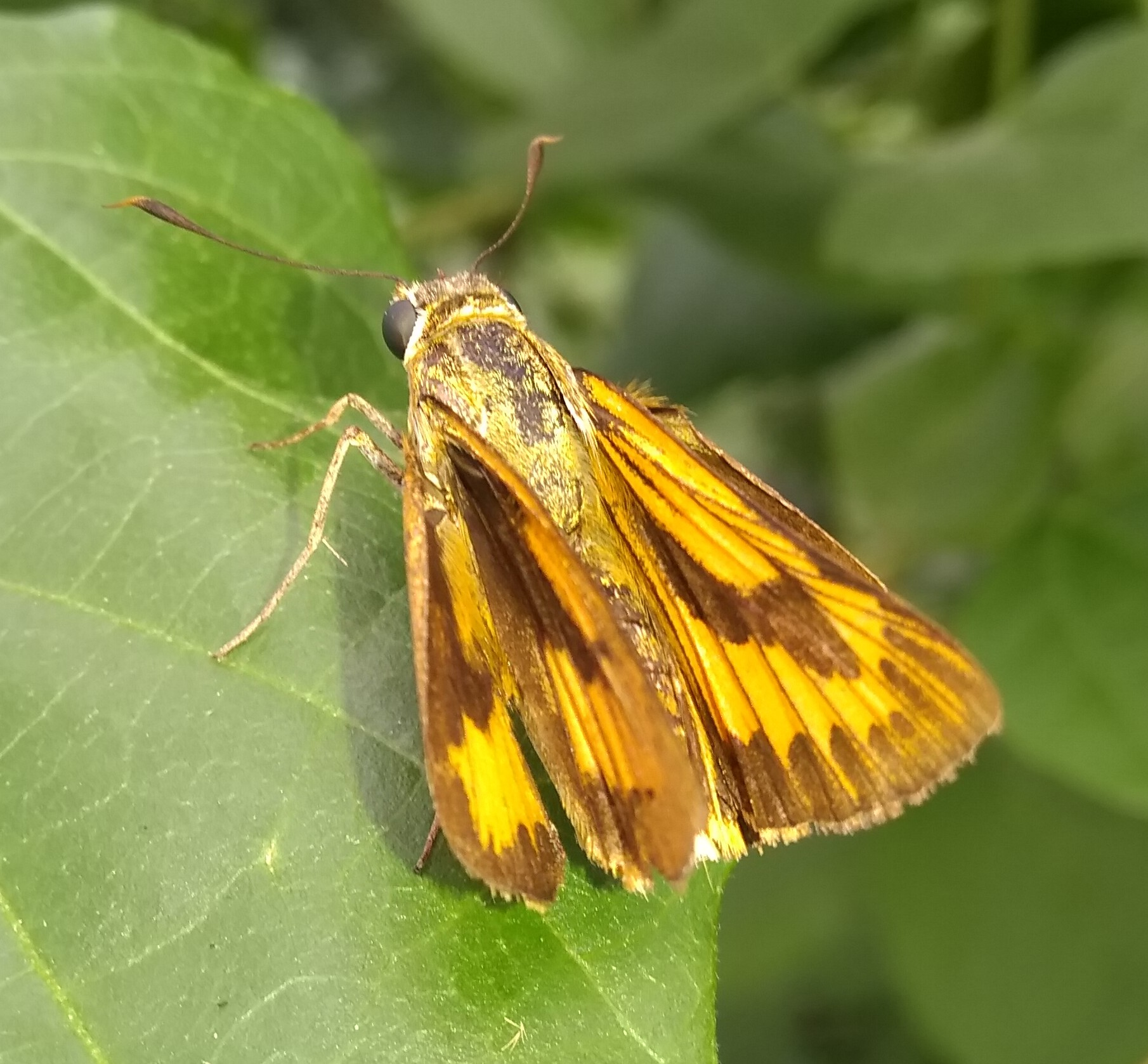
- from Sri Lanka
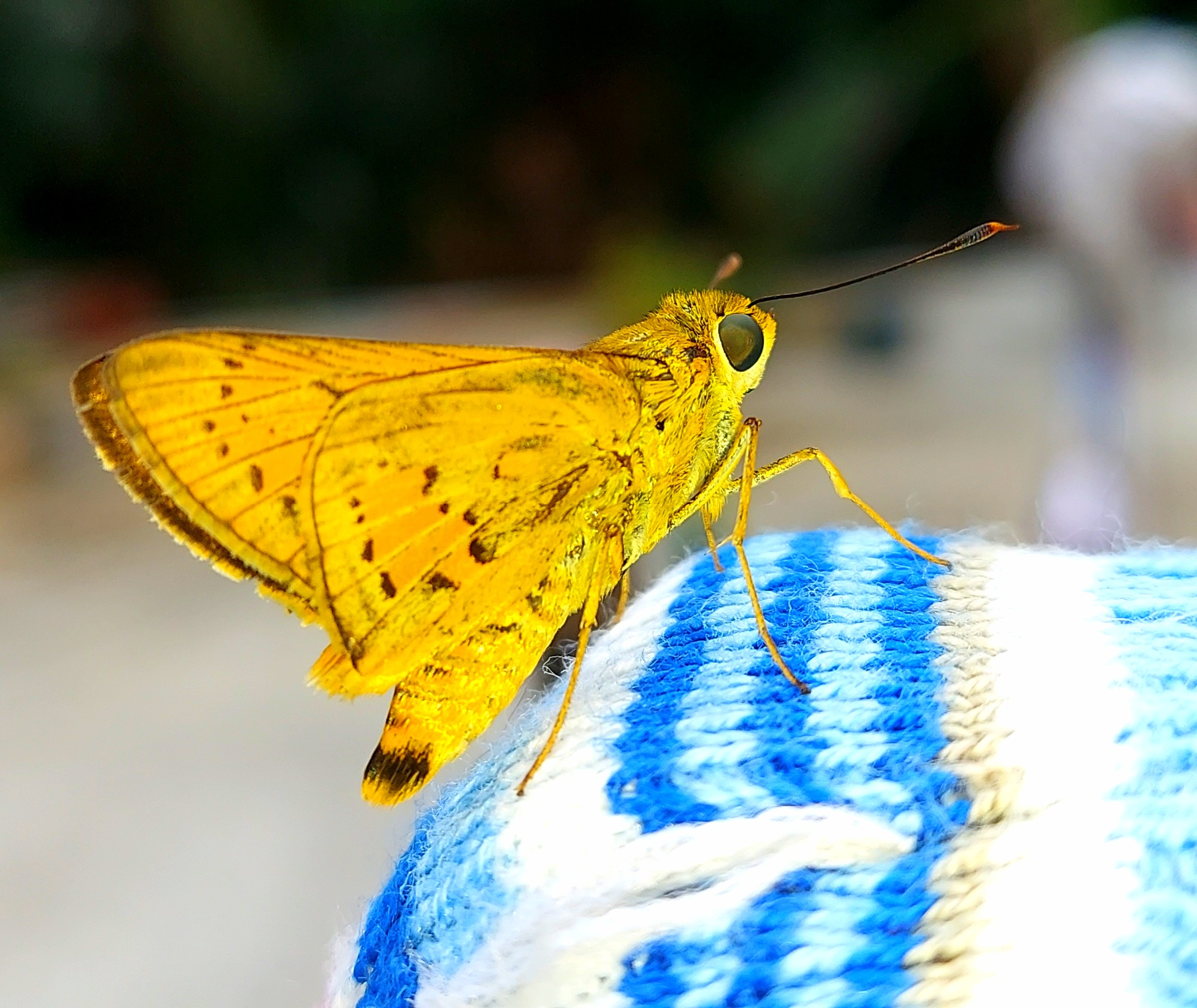

Scientific classification
- Kingdom: Animalia
- Phylum: Arthropoda
- Class: Insecta
- Order: Lepidoptera
- Family: Hesperiidae
- Genus: Cephrenes
- Species: C. trichopepla

Binomial name
- Cephrenes trichopepla (Lower, 1908)

Synonyms
- Erynnis trichopepla Lower, 1908

= Cephrenes trichopepla =

Yellow palm dart

Species of butterfly

Cephrenes trichopepla, the yellow palm dart, is a butterfly of the family Hesperiidae. It is found in Australia (the south-eastern coast of New South Wales, the northern Gulf and northern coast of the Northern Territory, the northern Gulf and northern coast of Queensland and the northern coast of Western Australia), Papua and Papua New Guinea. It has recently been recorded from Singapore and Sri Lanka.

The wingspan is about 40 mm.

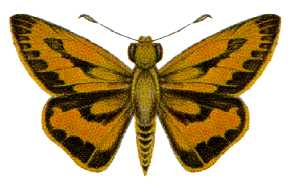

The larvae feed on a wide range of palm species and it is considered a pest of coconut palm.

Recorded food plants include Archontophoenix alexandrae, Wodyetia bifurcata, Ptychosperma elegans, Archontophoenix cunninghamiana, Livistona australis, Livistona benthamii, Livistona nitida, Livistona muelleri, Livistona mariae, Livistona drudei and Livistona decipiens.
