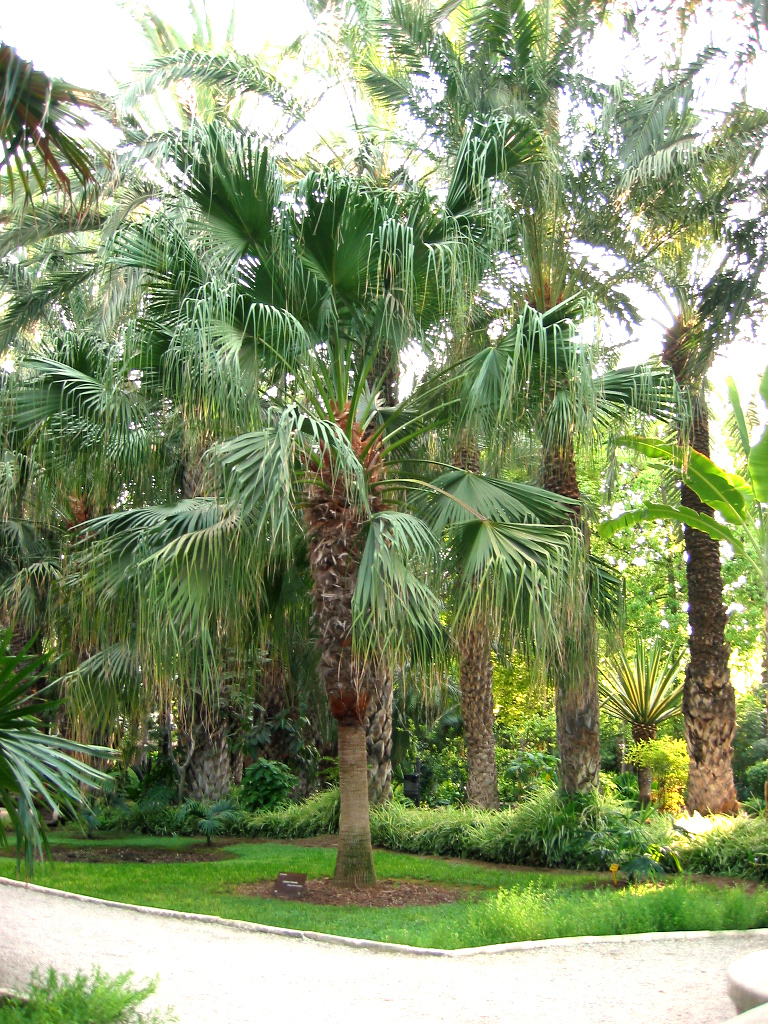
- Livistona chinensis

Scientific classification
- Kingdom: Plantae
- Clade: Tracheophytes
- Clade: Angiosperms
- Clade: Monocots
- Clade: Commelinids
- Order: Arecales
- Family: Arecaceae
- Subfamily: Coryphoideae
- Tribe: Trachycarpeae
- Genus: Livistona; R.Br.

Synonyms
- Wissmannia Burret

= Livistona =

Genus of palms

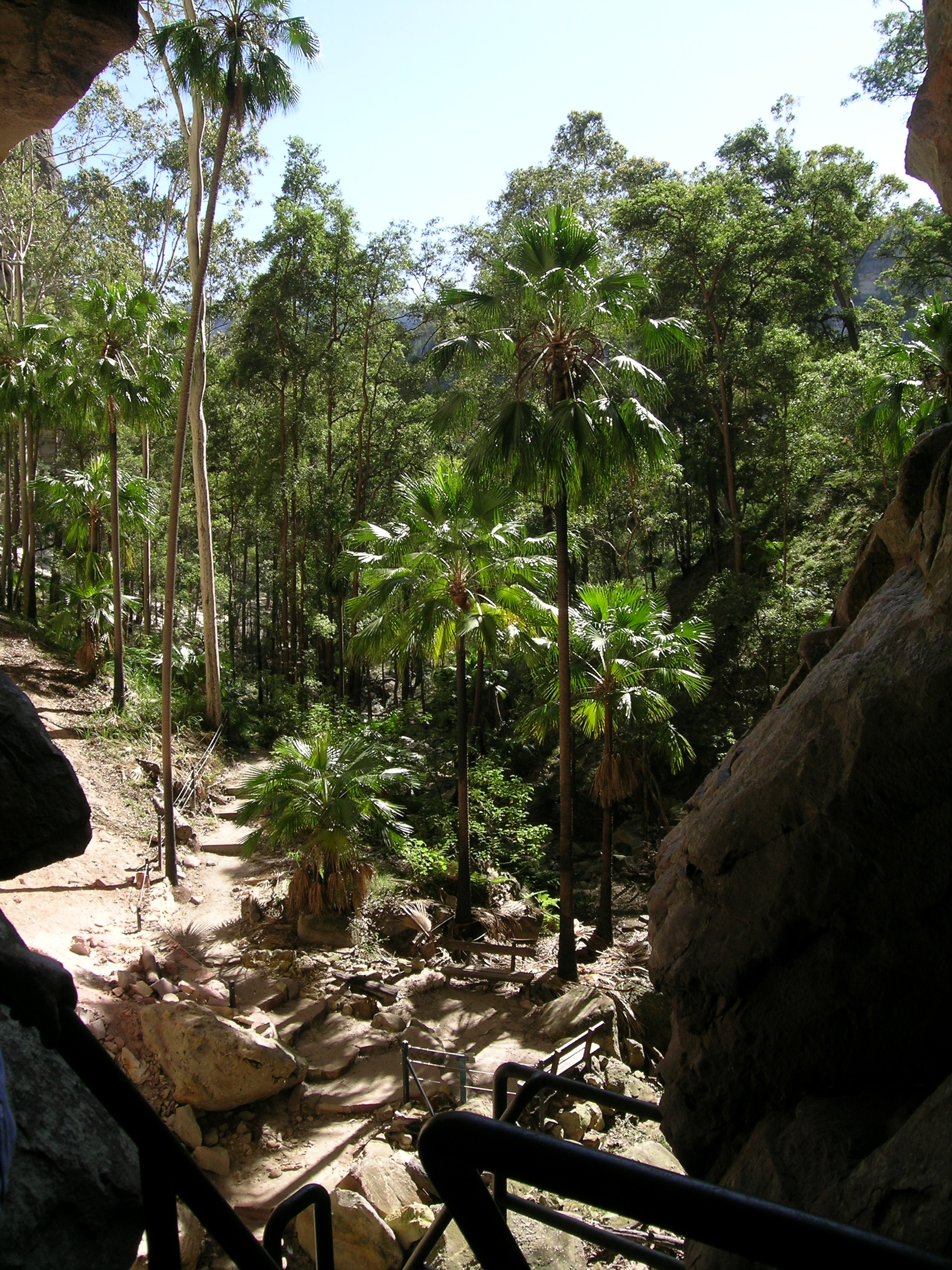
Livistona nitida, the Carnarvon fan palm, as seen from the Amphitheatre in Carnarvon National Park, Australia.

Livistona is a genus of palms, the botanical family Arecaceae, native to southeastern and eastern Asia, Australasia, and the Horn of Africa. They are fan palms, the leaves with an armed petiole terminating in a rounded, costapalmate fan of numerous leaflets.

L. speciosa, locally called kho, gives its name to Khao Kho District in Thailand.

== Taxonomy ==
The genus was established by Robert Brown in his Prodromus Florae Novae Hollandiae (1810) to accommodate his descriptions of two species collected during an expedition to Australia. The names published by Brown were Livistona humilis and L. inermis, describing material he had collected in the north of Australia, a partial taxonomic revision in 1963 nominated the first of these as the lectotype. His collaborator Ferdinand Bauer, the botanist and master illustrator, produced artworks to accompany Brown's descriptions, but these were not published until 1838.

In 1983 a species of palm from Somalia was formally transferred to the genus by John Dransfield and Natalie Whitford Uhl.

The Australian members of the genus were subjected to a taxonomic revision by Tony Rodd in 1998. Rodd added five new Australian species, increasing the size of the genus. Another species was described from Vietnam in 2000. In 2009 John Leslie Dowe published the latest monograph on the genus. Along with the Indonesian botanist Johanis P. Mogea and Anders Sánchez Barfod from Denmark, he had described five new species in the previous years, further swelling the genus.

For much of the history of the genus, the species of the genus Saribus were classified within the genus Livistona. Phylogenetic studies using DNA comparisons of numerous species in the different genera in the Trachycarpeae tribe of palms, however, found that the species from the Philippines, New Guinea and other surrounding regions were more closely related to Pholidocarpus, Licuala and Johannesteijsmannia than they were to Livistona, which advocated separating the two groups taxonomically. The genus was thus revised again by Christine D. Bacon and William J. Baker in 2011, with Saribus split off and combined with Pritchardiopsis jeanneneyi, decreasing the genus again.

=== Etymology ===
Robert Brown named the genus Livistona after Patrick Murray (1634–1671), Baron of Livingston, a botanist and horticulturist, who was largely responsible for establishing the botanical gardens in Edinburgh, Scotland. Brown's praise for the early horticulturist begins, "… in memoriam viri nobilis Patricii Murray Baronis de Livistone,", and the Latinised name of the genus is evidently derived from the name of the family's seat.

== Distribution ==
The genus has a disjunct distribution, which is split into three contiguous areas. The range of Livistona carinensis in Africa is very far away from that of the other species in the genus. In 1983 John Dransfield and Natalie Whitford Uhl first suggested that this odd pattern was due to a formerly much more extensive distribution during the warmer and moister climate of the Miocene, including areas between it and the rest, but that prehistoric climate change split them. Later DNA evidence of a mass of ancient extinctions between L. carinensis and the rest is thought to corroborate the theory. The recognition of Saribus has split the remaining distribution into a group of species found in Australia and southern New Guinea, and another group of species in East and Southeast Asia.

== Species ==
The classification of the genus has been the subject of a number of recent revisions which have reduced the number of species since the 2009 monograph. As of July 2025, Plants of the World Online accepts 28 species.

- Livistona alfredii F.Muell. - Australia: Western Australia
- Livistona australis (R.Br.) Mart. – Cabbage-tree palm - Australia: New South Wales, Queensland, Victoria
- Livistona benthamii F.M.Bailey - Australia: Queensland, Northern Territory; New Guinea
- Livistona boninensis (Becc.) Nakai - Bonin Islands
- Livistona carinensis (Chiov.) J.Dransf. & N.W.Uhl - Djibouti, Somalia, Yemen
- Livistona chinensis (Jacq.) R.Br. ex Mart. – Chinese fan palm - Japan: South and Ryukyu Islands, China: Guangdong, Hainan, Taiwan; naturalized in South Africa, Java, New Caledonia, Hawaii, Micronesia, Florida, Dominican Republic, Bermuda, Puerto Rico, and various island in the Indian Ocean
- Livistona concinna Dowe & Barfod - Australia: Queensland
- Livistona decora (W.Bull) Dowe - Australia: Queensland
- Livistona drudei F.Muell. ex Drude - Australia: Queensland
- Livistona eastonii C.A.Gardner, known as darngarna on the Mitchell Plateau - Australia: Western Australia
- Livistona endauensis J.Dransf. & K.M.Wong - Peninsular Malaysia
- Livistona exigua J.Dransf. - Brunei
- Livistona fulva Rodd - Australia: Queensland
- Livistona halongensis T.H.Nguyên & Kiew - Ha Long Bay Islands in Vietnam
- Livistona humilis R.Br. - Australia: Northern Territory
- Livistona inermis R.Br. - Australia: Northern Territory, Queensland
- Livistona jenkinsiana Griff. - Bhutan, India: Arunachal Pradesh, Assam; Myanmar, Thailand, China: Hainan, Yunnan
- Livistona lanuginosa Rodd - Australia: Queensland
- Livistona leichhardtii F.Muell.. - Australia: Northern Territory, Western Australia
- Livistona mariae F.Muell. – three subspecies Australia: Northern Territory, Queensland
- Livistona muelleri F.M.Bailey - Australia: Queensland; New Guinea
- Livistona nasmophila Dowe & D.L.Jones - Australia: Western Australia
- Livistona nitida Rodd – Carnarvon Fan Palm - Australia: Queensland
- Livistona rigida Becc. - Australia: Northern Territory, Queensland
- Livistona saribus (Lour.) Merr. ex A.Chev. - Indochina, Malaysia, Borneo, Java, Philippines; naturalized in Polynesia, China: Guangdong, Yunnan
- Livistona speciosa Kurz - Myanmar, Thailand, Vietnam, Peninsular Malaysia, Bangladesh, southern China
- Livistona tahanensis Becc. - Pahang in Malaysia
- Livistona victoriae Rodd - Australia: Western Australia, Northern Territory

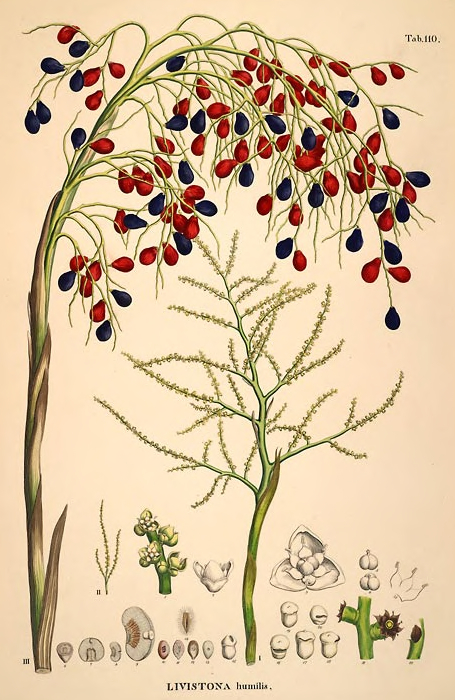
Livistona humilis by Ferdinand Bauer in Martius Historia naturalis palmarum (1838)

Formerly placed here

- Pholidocarpus kingianus (Becc.) Ridl. (Livistona kingiana)
- Pritchardia gaudichaudii (Mart.) H.Wendl. (Livistona gaudichaudii)
- Pritchardia martii (Gaudich.) H.Wendl. (Livistona martii)
- Saribus brevifolius (Dowe & Mogea) C.D.Bacon & W.J.Baker - (Livistona brevifolia)
- Saribus chocolatinus (Dowe) C.D.Bacon & W.J.Baker - (Livistona chocolatina)
- Saribus merrillii (Becc.) C.D.Bacon & W.J.Baker - (Livistona merrillii, L. whitfordii, L. blancoi)
- Saribus papuanus (Becc.) Kuntze - (Livistona papuana)
- Saribus rotundifolius (Lam.) Blume (Livistona rotundifolia, L. altissima, L. microcarpa, L. mindorensis)
- Saribus surru (Dowe & Barfod) C.D.Bacon & W.J.Baker - (Livistona surru)
- Saribus tothur (Dowe & Barfod) C.D.Bacon & W.J.Baker - (Livistona tothur)
- Saribus woodfordii (Ridl.) C.D.Bacon & W.J.Baker - (Livistona woodfordii, L. beccariana)

== Ecology ==
Livistona species are used as food plants by the larvae of some Lepidoptera species. In Australia, the species Cephrenes trichopepla and C. augiades sperthias have been recorded on a number of different Livistona species. In Asia, Elymnias hypermnestra and likely Gangara thyrsis feed on Livistona. A number of other Lepidoptera which do not naturally occur to the native range of the genus Livistona have been recorded feeding on these palms, including Batrachedra arenosella (recorded on L. subglobosa), Brassolis astyra astyra, Opsiphanes cassina, O. invirae and Paysandisia archon.

P. archon is a giant day-flying moth of which the caterpillars known to attack the piths of a number of these palm species, along with many other genera, at least in Europe, where neither the moth nor palms are native. It can kill the palm. It prefers genera of palm with more hairy trunks like Trachycarpus, Trithrinax or Chamaerops.
