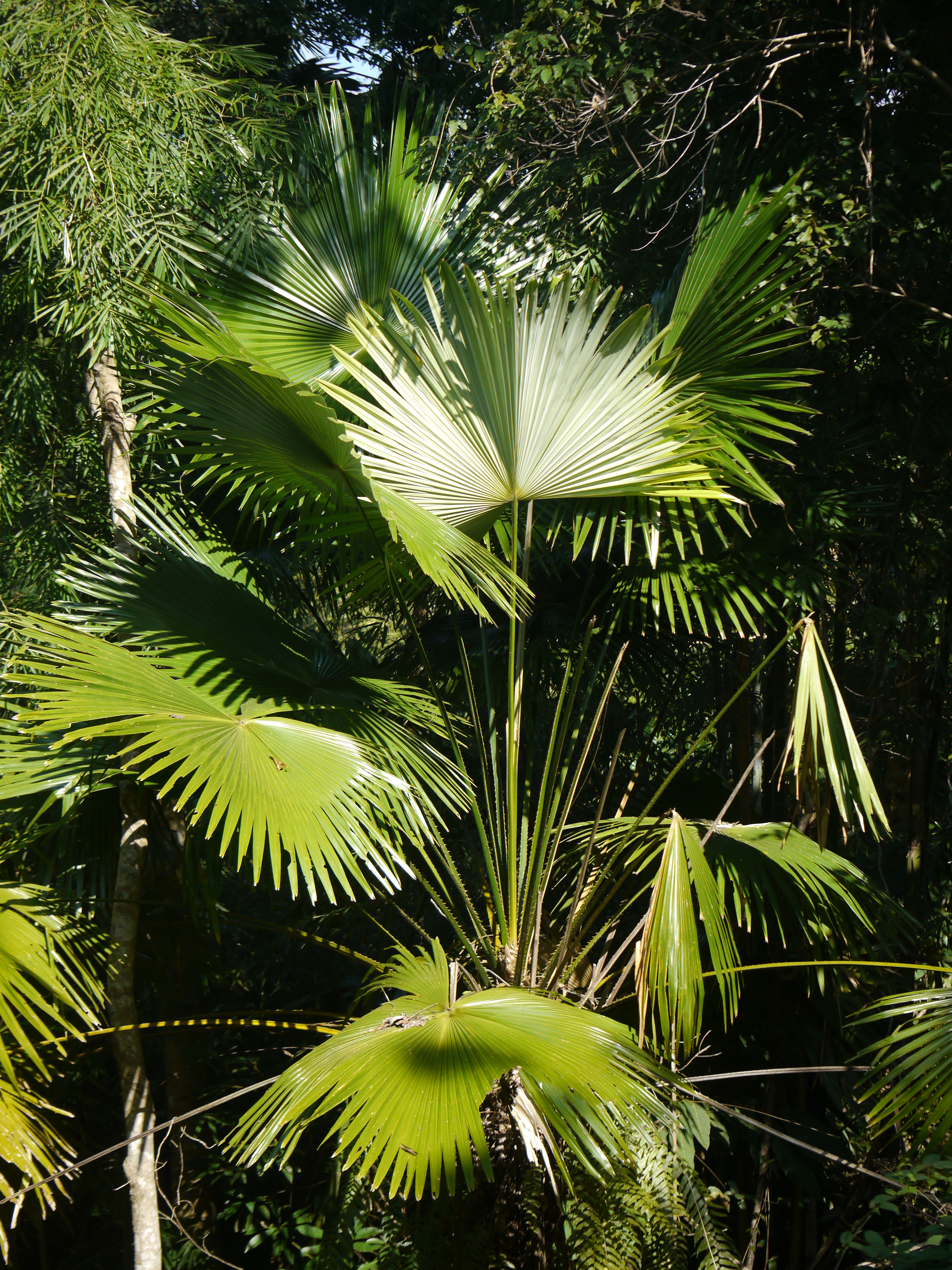

Scientific classification
- Kingdom: Plantae
- Clade: Embryophytes
- Clade: Tracheophytes
- Clade: Angiosperms
- Clade: Monocots
- Clade: Commelinids
- Order: Arecales
- Family: Arecaceae
- Tribe: Trachycarpeae
- Genus: Livistona
- Species: L. jenkinsiana

Binomial name
- Livistona jenkinsiana Griff.
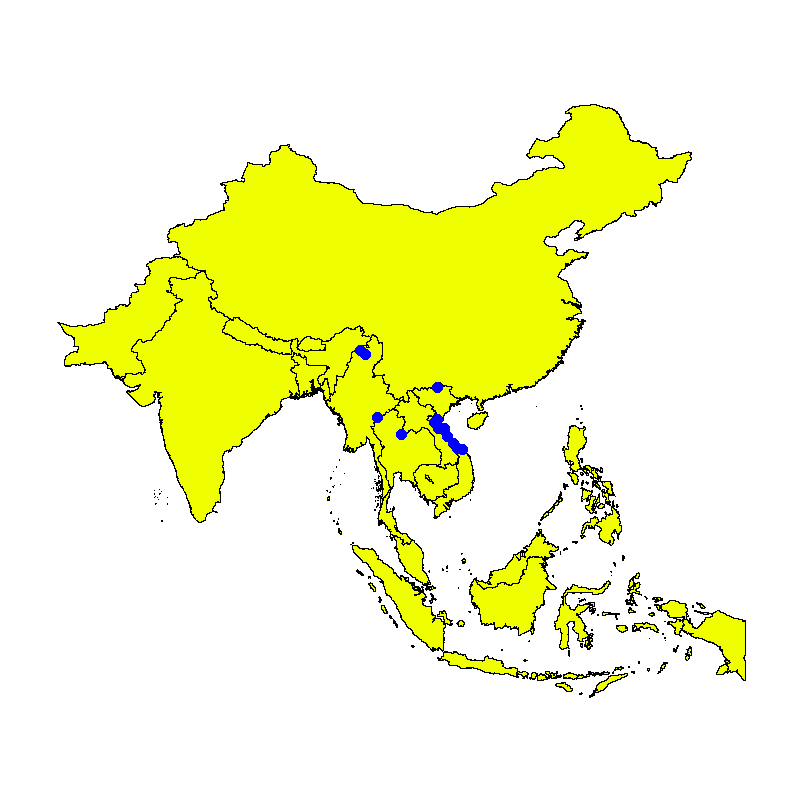
- Occurrence data from GBIF

Synonyms
- Latania jenkinsiana (Griff.) Paxton & Lindl.; Saribus jenkinsianus (Griff.) Kuntze; Livistona jenkinsii Griff. ex Mart.; Livistona moluccana Schaedtler

= Livistona jenkinsiana =

Species of palm

Livistona jenkinsiana (Major Jenkins' fan palm) is a species of fan palm in the family Arecaceae.

== Description ==
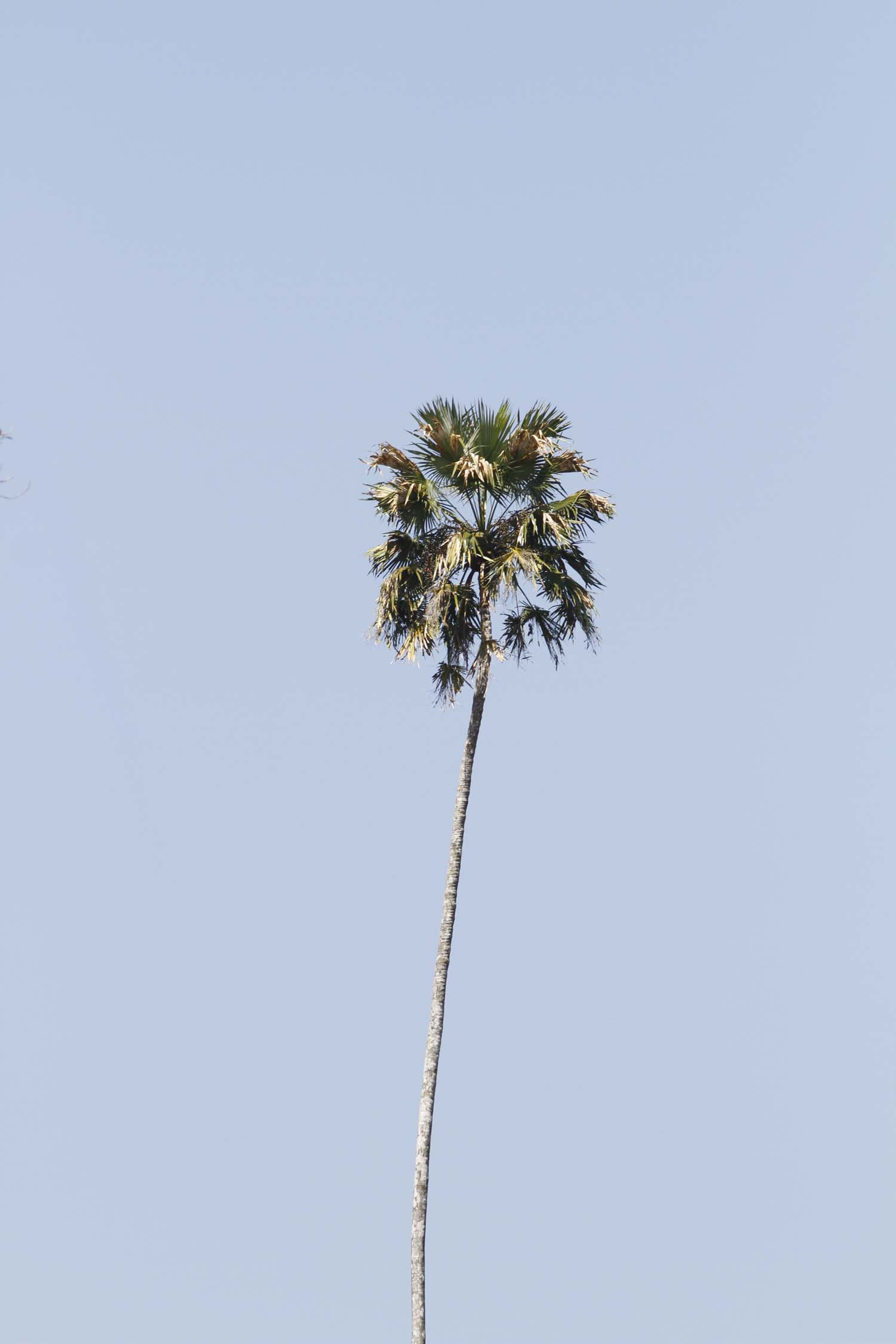
A tall Livistona jenkensiana at Sangu Reserve Forest, Bangladesh

It is a palm with large fan-shaped leaves on spiny petioles. It is very similar to L. speciosa in its leaves and the downward curving spines on the petioles of its leaves, but it is distinguished from this species by its fruit colour (leaden-blue vs turquoise-iridescent), by its fruit being wider than long vs longer than wide, and by the branching of its infructescence which is to the third-order rather than the fourth.

== Distribution ==
The species is native to Bangladesh (Chittagong), Myanmar, India (Arunachal Pradesh, Assam, Madhya Pradesh, Meghalaya, Nagaland, Sikkim, West Bengal), Bhutan, China (Yunnan) and Thailand (northern and peninsular).
