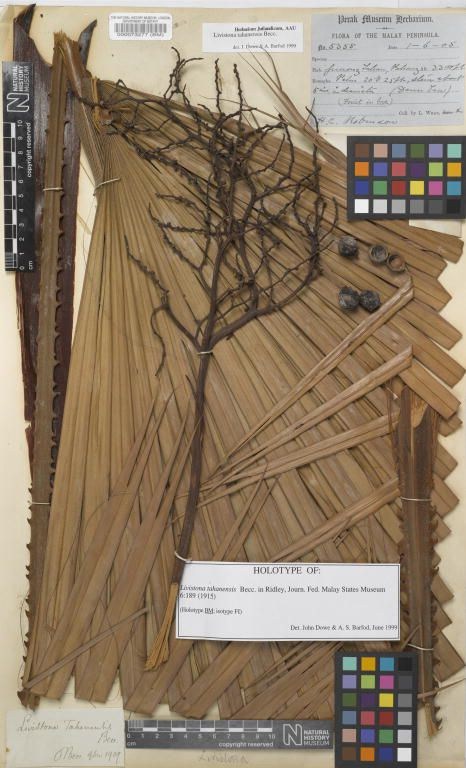
- Livistona tahanensis holotype, Natural History Museum (London)

Conservation status
- Conservation Dependent (IUCN 2.3)

Scientific classification
- Kingdom: Plantae
- Clade: Tracheophytes
- Clade: Angiosperms
- Clade: Monocots
- Clade: Commelinids
- Order: Arecales
- Family: Arecaceae
- Tribe: Trachycarpeae
- Genus: Livistona
- Species: L. tahanensis

Binomial name
- Livistona tahanensis Becc.

= Livistona tahanensis =

Species of palm

Livistona tahanensis is a species of medium-sized palm tree of the genus Livistona, found on only one mountain top in Pahang, Peninsular Malaysia. In Malay the palm is known as Tahan serdang, or as daun tau.

T.C. Whitmore, writing in 1970, describes that the palms are seen after a four days' hike from Kuala Tahan, up the ridge behind Kuala Teku through tall dipterocarp jungle, until, suddenly, at 2,940 feet (900 m) in altitude up the slopes of the remote Gunong Tahan (Tahan mountain), the dense vegetation breaks and a low, stunted, small-leaved, upper montane forest takes over, continuing to 4,500 feet (1,400 m), and in sheltered locations to 5,000 feet (1,500 m). Out of this elfin forest, the stiff crowns of Tahan serdang grow as emergents, and the air is filled with the sound of the wind sighing through them.

The palm hearts are eaten by wild elephants.

== Taxonomy ==
Livistona tahanensis was first formally described as a new species by the Italian palm specialist Odoardo Beccari in 1921. The name had in fact already been used in 1915 by Henry Nicholas Ridley, published in An annotated list of plants of Gunung Tahan, Pahang, Malaysia, with the understanding that Beccari would soon provide a description.

The holotype was collected by L. Wray and H. C. Robinson at 1,000 metres altitude on Gunung Tahan, it is their collection number 5355, and it was kept at the herbarium of the Perak Museum in Malaysia.

== Description ==
This plant is a medium-sized, hermaphrodite fan palm, which grows up to 7.6–8 metres (25–26 ft) in height, with a 12 centimetres (4.7 in) trunk diameter at breast height. The trunk has narrow leaf scars, and a narrow amount of space between each successive one, although this is usually obscured by the petiole stubs, which remain persistent, not falling off, for most of the length. The crown of the palm is globose (round), and it contains some 30 to 40 leaves.

The leaves are costapalmate. For a Livistona, the leaves are quite small: 57–76 centimetres (22–30 in) long, by 3 feet (91 cm) wide. They are stiff and flat to undulate, subcircular, and divided regularly, splitting up the leaf blade into narrow segments or pinnae from its middle to some 58% of its length -these are forked or bifurcated at their end 1 inch (2.5 cm) deep, or 16% of their length, and are not drooping, but rigid, and stiffly held up. There are 40 to 50 segments. The leaf blades are dark green on their upper sides. On mature trees, the leaves are grey to grey-green on the undersides. There are six to seven parallel veins on each side of the midrib. The transverse veins thinner than parallel veins. The petiole is slender, 70 centimetres (2.3 ft) to 4 feet (120 cm) long, and spiny down its length. It is 12-15mm wide in the middle, but 5-6mm wide at the end where it joins the leaf blade. The adaxial side of the petiole, the upper surface, is flat, and it has scattered appressed hyaline (glassy-looking) scales, with ciliate hairs along their margins. Both left and right edges of the petiole have short, flat, brown, blunt, triangular, 5-8mm long spines down their entire length, these spines reduce in size as they march towards the leaf blade. The sheath is coloured dark, chocolate brown. The 'appendages', a bundle of fibres forming tongue-like straps on either side of the leaf-base, are bright mahogany red, and are polished on both sides. It is very long and membranous. The leaf or petiole-bases remain on the trunk for very many years, these have fine, prominent fibres, and slowly disintegrate on the tree as opposed to eventually falling off in one piece.

The 80–91 centimetres (31–36 in) long inflorescence is unbranched at the base, and does not extend beyond the limits of the crown of leaves. It is branched to three orders, with four 'partial inflorescences', the longest of these growing to some 23 centimetres (9.1 in) long. The rachis bracts are loosely tubular. This species has no peduncular bracts. The peduncle is 2.5 centimetres (0.98 in) wide at its base; the rachillae are 7–10 centimetres (2.8–3.9 in) long, and are thin, green-red in colour, and with a tomentose indumentum. The minute flowers are coloured golden-yellow or cream. The sepals are ovate in shape, and are coloured a cream tipped in red. The in-curved petals are coloured cream, are oblong in shape, and their apex is blunt and thickened. The anthers are white. The style is short, and conic in shape.

The pedicel is 2-3mm long. The fruit is coloured glossy green at maturity, with white spots. It is roundish, or slightly longer than broad, or the opposite, and 1.2–1.5 centimetres (0.47–0.59 in) long, by 1.2–1.3 centimetres (0.47–0.51 in) in width. The epicarp has a smooth surface marked with lip-like structures, with a suture line which extends for the full length of the fruit.

== Distribution ==
Livistona tahanensis is endemic to Gunong Tahan, a mountain in the state of Pahang, in the east of Peninsular Malaysia. It is only found between Tangga Lima Belas and Pangkin camps.

In the limited territory where it is known to grow it is common.

== Ecology ==
The preferred habitat of the palm is a low, stunted, small-leaved, upper montane forest, sometimes called an 'elfin forest', on exposed ridges. The palm can be found growing at 900 to 1,400 metres, in some sheltered areas to 1,500 metres, in altitude. The stunted nature of the forest in this area of the Gunong Tahan is due to an underlying outcropping of quartzite, resistant to weathering, which cause the soil in this area to be composed of a layer of peat several feet thick, and nothing else upon the bedrock. It is moist in these montane forests. Here, the stiff crowns of Tahan serdang grow as emergents, and are a significant, even dominant, part of the canopy.

There are wild elephants up on this mountain, and they destroy the plants by eating the cabbages and hearts of the palm.

== Conservation ==
It is likely naturally restricted in distribution, but it is common where it occurs. Because it is an endemic species, in 1998 the conservation status was assessed for the IUCN Red List, this being assessed as 'lower risk, conservation dependent'. It was not evaluated in the Malaysia Plant Red List, published 2010.
