= Livistona endauensis =

Conservation status
- Near Threatened (IUCN 2.3)

Scientific classification
- Kingdom: Plantae
- Clade: Tracheophytes
- Clade: Angiosperms
- Clade: Monocots
- Clade: Commelinids
- Order: Arecales
- Family: Arecaceae
- Tribe: Trachycarpeae
- Genus: Livistona
- Species: L. endauensis

Binomial name
- Livistona endauensis J.Dransf. & K.M.Wong

Species of palm

Livistona endauensis is a species of palm tree of the genus Livistona. It is a tree endemic to Peninsular Malaysia. It has been called Endau fan palm in English. In Malay the palm is known as bertam or serdang Endau.

== Taxonomy ==
Livistona endauensis was recognised as a new species relatively recently, being described in 1987 by John Dransfield and Khoon Meng Wong in an article published in the Malayan Nature Journal. The holotype was collected by Dransfield at 400 metres in altitude in 1977 on the Gunong Janing ('Janing mountain'), a mountain in the state of Johor, and has the collection number JD#5089. It is housed at the herbarium at Kew Botanical Gardens, with an isotype kept at the herbarium at the Forest Research Institute Malaysia in Kepong.

== Description ==
The seed is round and about 1 cm in diameter; the testa intrudes shallowly into its surface. The eophyll, which is the first fully-expanded leaf of a seedling palm, has five ribs.

== Ecology ==
It is found in lowland open and closed forests. In the jungles where it occurs, it is found in a specific habitat on edaphically marginal, infertile soils on slopes, ridges and on hill tops. In such places it is a dominant part of the vegetation, but only in some areas. This is thought to very likely be due to being specialised on growing in sedimentary soil derived from granite or igneous rock from the Jasin complex. Other often conspicuous trees associated with this habitat are the dipterocarps Cotylelobium lanceolatum and Shorea blumutensis.

It is found in an area where there were still a relative number of wild rhinos in the 1970s.

== Conservation ==
In 1998 it was assessed as a 'near threatened' species in the IUCN Red List, because its populations were severely fragmented, and there was a decline of mature individuals at the time. It was not evaluated in the Malaysia Plant Red List, published 2010. A population is protected in the Endau-Rompin National Park.
