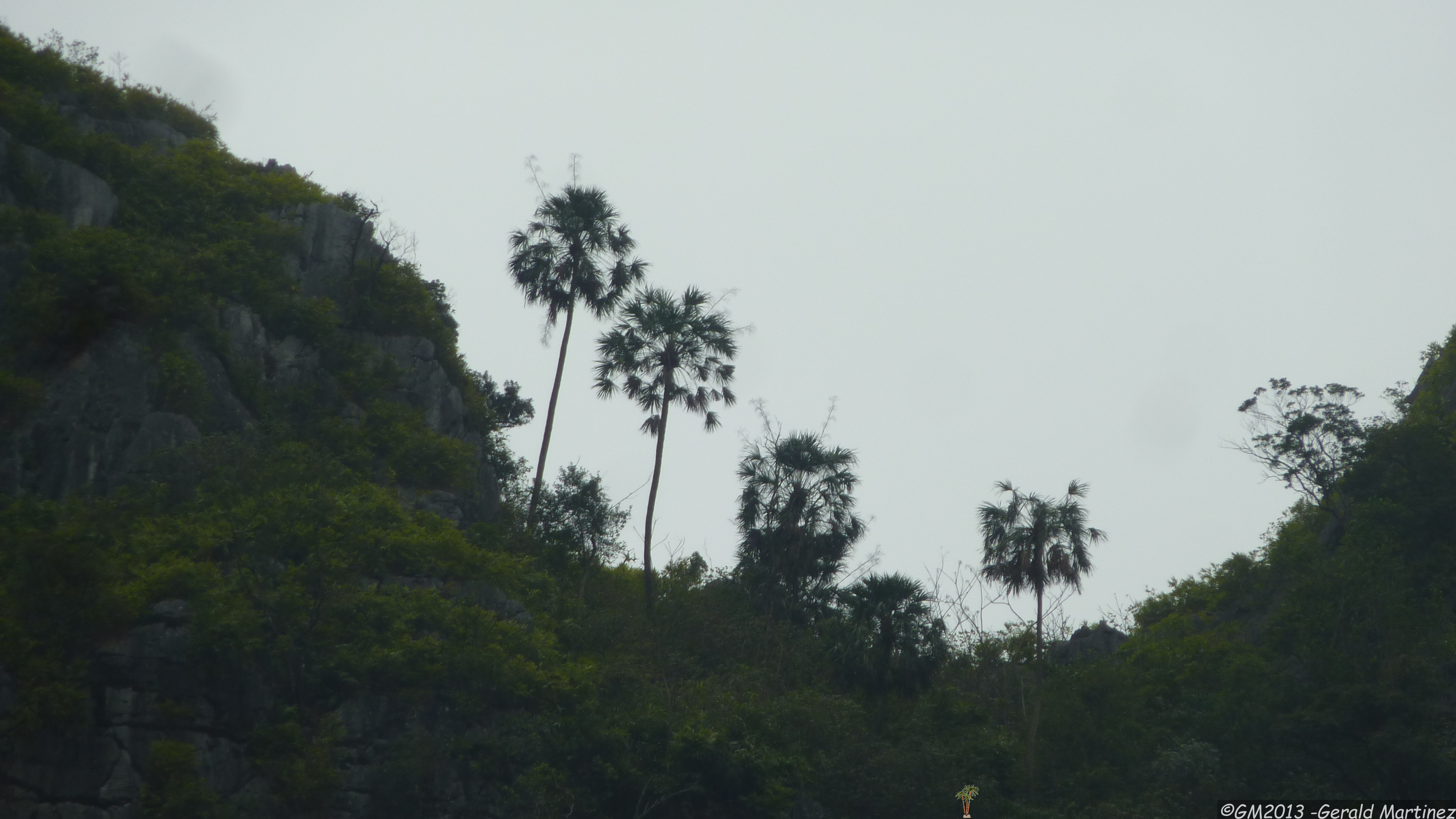

Scientific classification
- Kingdom: Plantae
- Clade: Tracheophytes
- Clade: Angiosperms
- Clade: Monocots
- Clade: Commelinids
- Order: Arecales
- Family: Arecaceae
- Tribe: Trachycarpeae
- Genus: Livistona
- Species: L. halongensis

Binomial name
- Livistona halongensis T.H.Nguyên & Kiew

= Livistona halongensis =

Species of palm

Livistona halongensis is a species of palm first collected in Ha Long Bay, Vietnam, in 1999. The species was described by Tiên Hiêp Nguyên and Ruth Kiew in 2000. It is a fan palm.

== Description ==
Livistona halongensis grows up to 10 metres (30 ft) tall, with a stem diameter of about 20 cm (8 in). The leaves measure up to 77 cm (30 in) long. The inflorescence bears yellow flowers. The fruit is green.

== Distribution and habitat ==
Livistona halongensis is endemic to Vietnam, where is it is confined to the islands of Hạ Long Bay, a UNESCO World Heritage Site. Its habitat is in crevices on the limestone islands.
