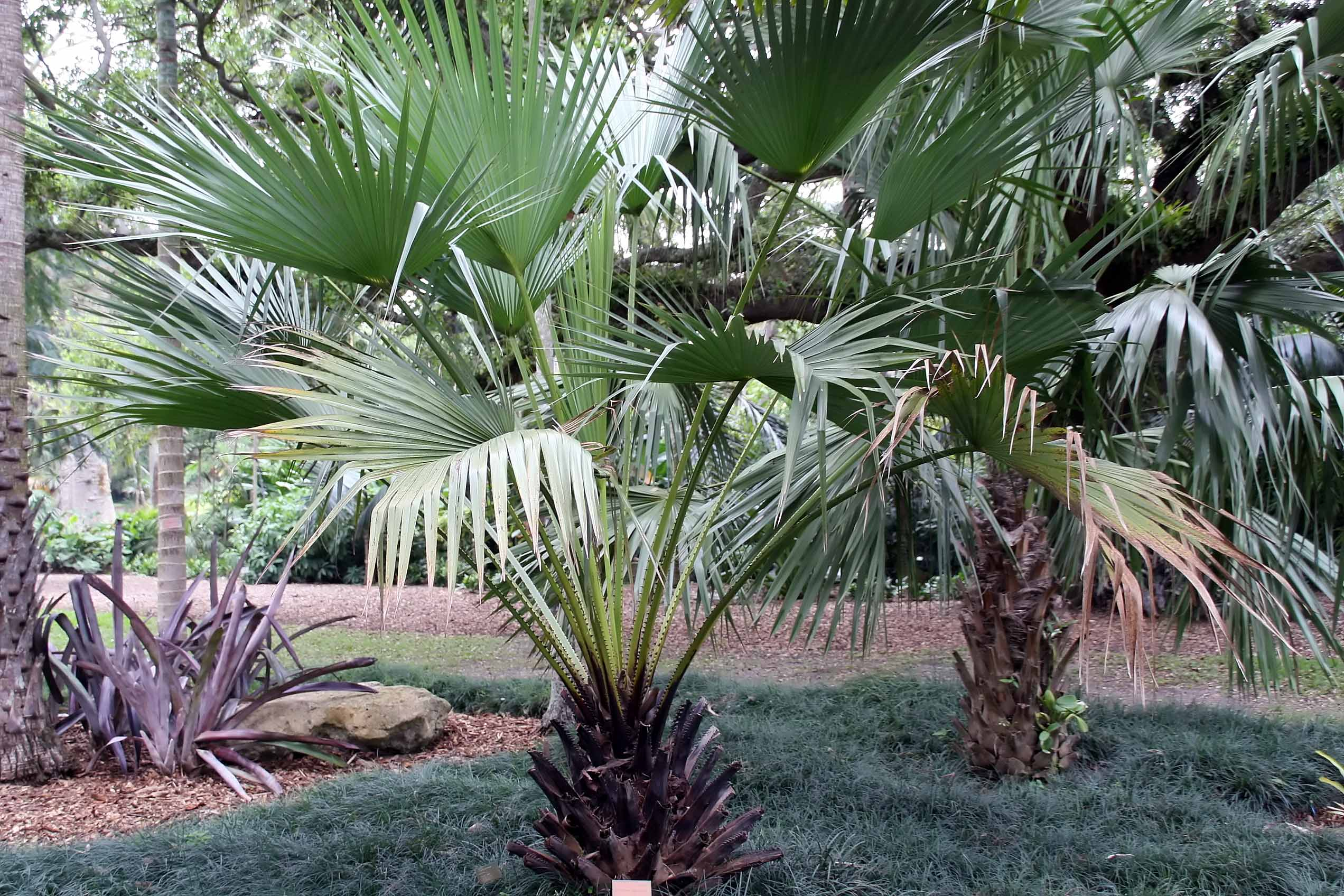

Conservation status
- Endangered (IUCN 3.1)

Scientific classification
- Kingdom: Plantae
- Clade: Tracheophytes
- Clade: Angiosperms
- Clade: Monocots
- Clade: Commelinids
- Order: Arecales
- Family: Arecaceae
- Genus: Livistona
- Species: L. carinensis

Binomial name
- Livistona carinensis (Chiov.) J.Dransf. & N.W.Uhl

Synonyms
- Hyphaene carinensis Chiov.; Wissmannia carinensis (Chiov.) Burret

= Livistona carinensis =

Species of palm

Livistona carinensis, commonly known as the Bankoualé palm, is a species of flowering plant in the family Arecaceae. It is one of the fan palms. Its leaves are distinguished by an armed petiole terminating in a rounded, costapalmate fan of numerous leaflets. Livistona carinensis is found in Djibouti, Somaliland, Somalia, and Yemen, and is threatened by habitat loss.
