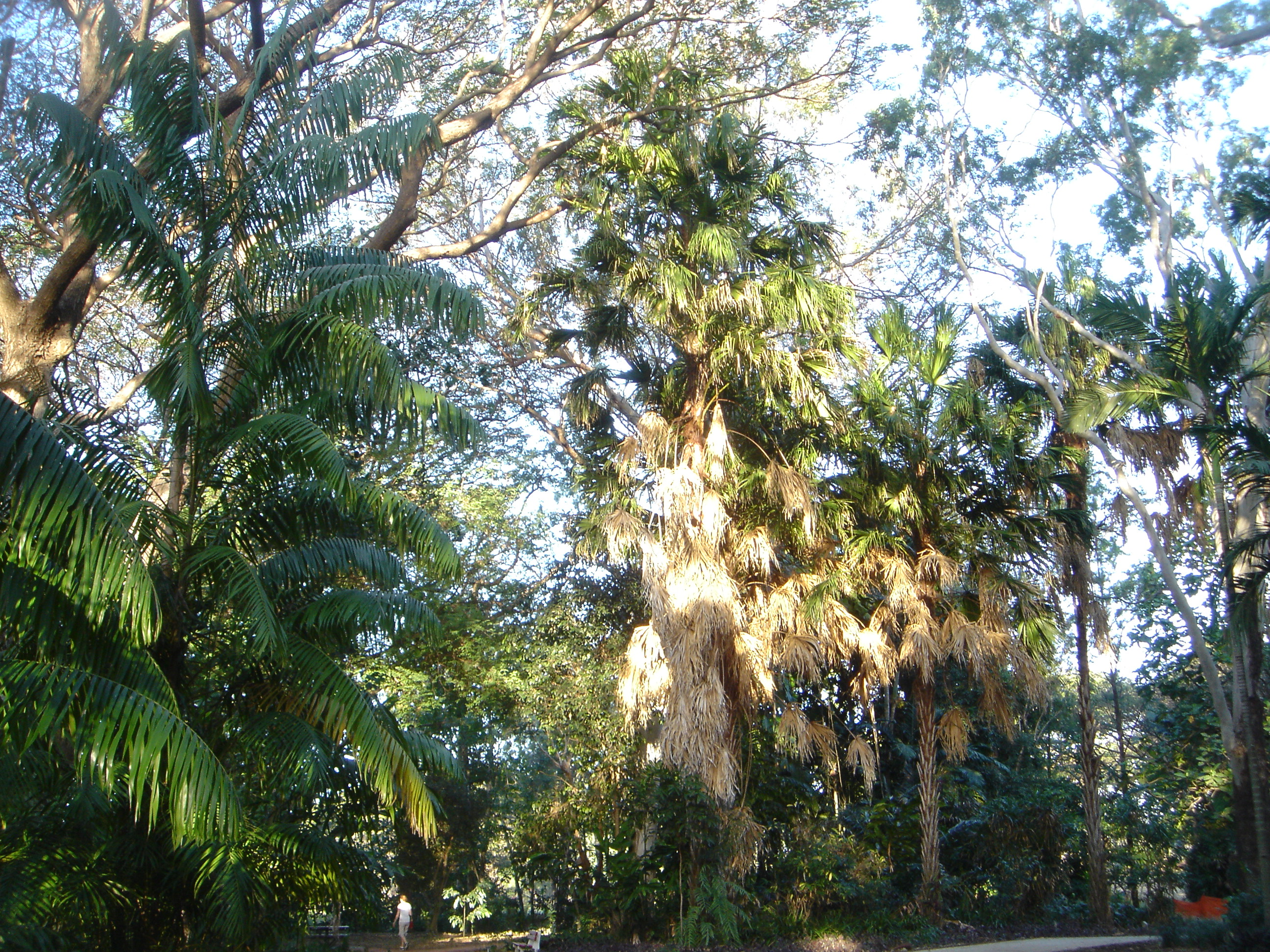

Conservation status
- Least Concern (IUCN 3.1)

Scientific classification
- Kingdom: Plantae
- Clade: Tracheophytes
- Clade: Angiosperms
- Clade: Monocots
- Clade: Commelinids
- Order: Arecales
- Family: Arecaceae
- Tribe: Trachycarpeae
- Genus: Livistona
- Species: L. saribus

Binomial name
- Livistona saribus (Lour.) Merr. ex A.Chev.

Synonyms
- Corypha saribus Lour.; Livistona cochinchinensis (Blume) Mart.; Livistona hasseltii (Hassk.) Hassk. ex Miq.; Livistona hoogendorpii Teijsm. & Binn. ex Miq.; Livistona hoogendorpii hort. ex André; Livistona inaequisecta Becc.; Livistona spectabilis Griff.; Livistona tonkinensis Magalon; Livistona vogamii Becc.; Sabal hoogendorpii (Teijsm. & Binn. ex Miq.) L.H.Bailey; Sabal hoogendorpii (Teijsm. & Binn. ex Miq.) Kuntze; Saribus cochinchinensis Blume; Saribus hasseltii Hassk.; Saribus hoogendorpii (Teijsm. & Binn. ex Miq.) Kuntze

= Livistona saribus =

Species of palm

Livistona saribus, also known as the swamp serdang or taraw palm, is a species of palm tree in the family Arecaceae. It is native to tropical Borneo, Cambodia, Java, Laos, Malaysia, the Philippines, Thailand, and Vietnam.

== Common names ==
One of the vernacular names in the Cambodian language is triëk. In Malay it is known as serdang, or sar in the state of Trengganu. The specific epithet saribus comes from a local name (for what was probably another palm species) in one of the Maluku languages: sariboe, as recorded by the Dutch.

== Description ==
Livistona saribus produces blue fruits, and is cold hardy to twenty-four degrees Celsius. It has spines along the leaf stems which resemble shark teeth. It usually grows to 12–18 metres (39–59 ft) in height, exceptionally to 30.5 metres (100 ft).

== Distribution ==
It has a native distribution stretching through Vietnam, Cambodia, Laos, Thailand, Peninsular Malaysia, Borneo, Java and the Philippines. It is also reportedly naturalized in the Society Islands of French Polynesia and also in the Guangdong and Yunnan regions of China.

It is widespread throughout Malaysia, but is rare in western Peninsular Malaysia, being found only in scattered localities on low hills. In the east, however, it forms extensive forests on the coastal hills in the state of Trengganu, and inland in the state of Pahang, as far south as to the Johore border.

== Ecology ==
L. saribus may occur as scattered individuals or in small to very large colonies, at 0–600 m altitude; it has been recorded from tropical seasonal forests, rainforests, near watercourses and associated swamp-forests, peatforests and near mangroves. It may also grow in closed, disturbed secondary forests.

== Uses ==
In Cambodia the leaves are used for thatch on huts and to make hats.
