= Livistona nasmophila =

Scientific classification
- Kingdom: Plantae
- Clade: Tracheophytes
- Clade: Angiosperms
- Clade: Monocots
- Clade: Commelinids
- Order: Arecales
- Family: Arecaceae
- Tribe: Trachycarpeae
- Genus: Livistona
- Species: L. nasmophila

Binomial name
- Livistona nasmophila Dowe & D.L.Jones

Synonyms
- Livistona mariae subsp. occidentalis Rodd

Species of palm

Livistona nasmophila is a species of flowering plant in the family Arecaceae. It is a palm tree native to the Kimberley Region of northeastern Western Australia.

Plants grow up 30 meters tall. They are functionally dioecious, flowering from July to October and fruiting from October to December.

The species is native to the Durack Range and Cambridge Gulf area. The palms grow along intermittent and permanent watercourses and in open forest from 50 to 200 metres elevation, sometimes forming very large colonies.
