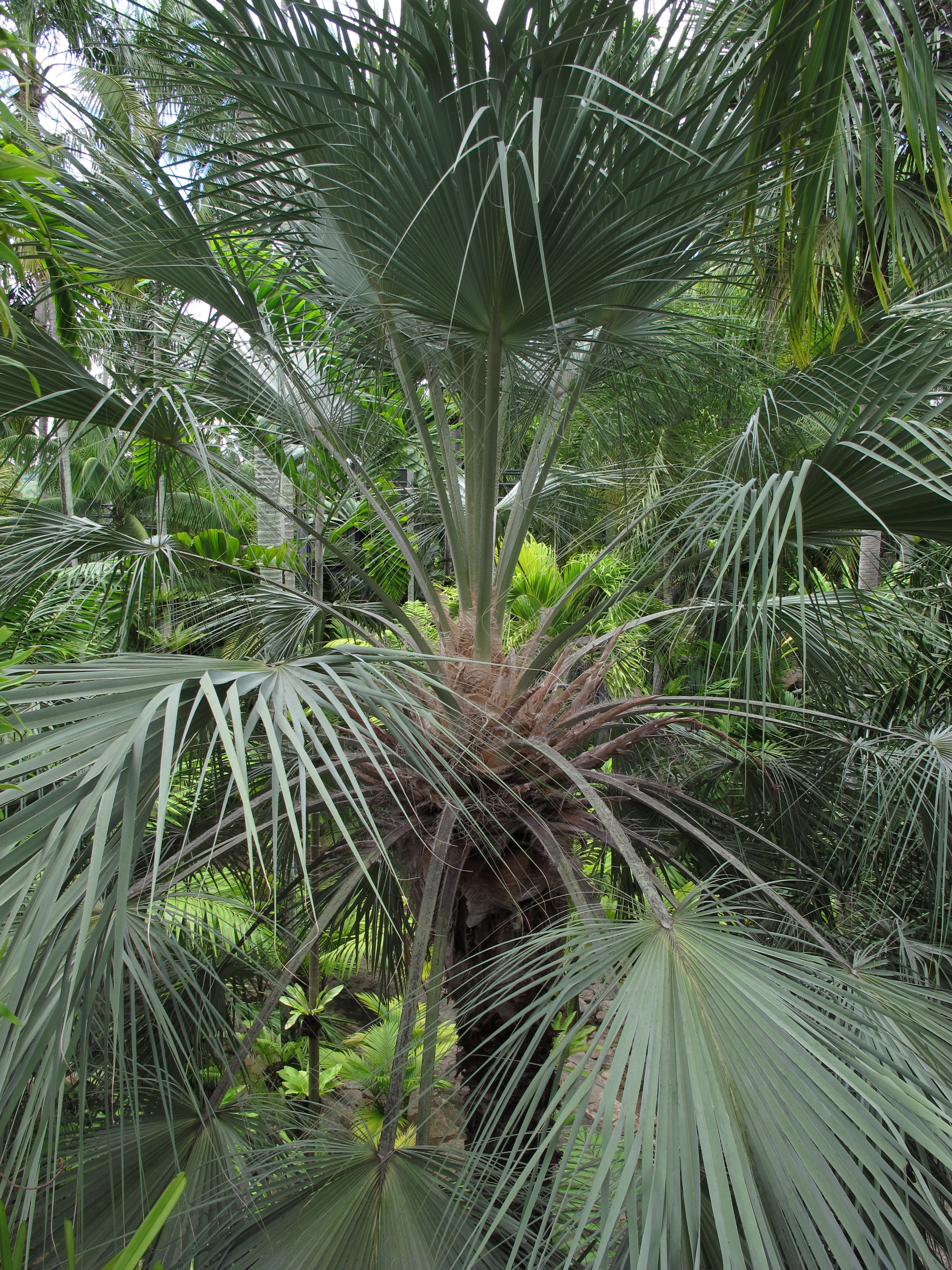

Conservation status
- Conservation Dependent (IUCN 2.3)

Scientific classification
- Kingdom: Plantae
- Clade: Tracheophytes
- Clade: Angiosperms
- Clade: Monocots
- Clade: Commelinids
- Order: Arecales
- Family: Arecaceae
- Tribe: Trachycarpeae
- Genus: Livistona
- Species: L. alfredii

Binomial name
- Livistona alfredii F.Muell.

Synonyms
- Livistona mariae F.Muell.; Livistona lorophylla Becc.; Livistona alfredi F.Muell.

= Livistona alfredii =

Species of palm

Livistona alfredii, the millstream palm or millstream fan palm, is a species of flowering plant in the family Arecaceae. It is found only in the north-west of Western Australia where it is threatened by habitat loss.

== Description ==
Livistona alfredii has cream flowers, flowers from July to September, and fruits from December to May. It is a dioecious palm, growing to 12 m, with prominent leaf scars. The petioles of dead leaves persist for the first metre, but shed higher up the stem. Fibres in the leaf-base are prominent, coarse, and persistent. The leaves are pale green-grey to glaucous on the upper surface, and light green-grey and waxy and dull on the lower surface. The inflorescences are unbranched at the base, and do not extend beyond the limit of the crown, but branch up to three orders. The flowers are solitary or in pairs, cylindrical in bud with triangular sepals.

== Distribution ==
This palm is endemic to the north-west of Western Australia. It has been found in Beard's Eremaean Province in the IBRA regions of Carnarvon and Pilbara, by the edges of permanent pools.

== Taxonomy ==
Livistona alfredii was first formally described by Ferdinand von Mueller in 1892.
