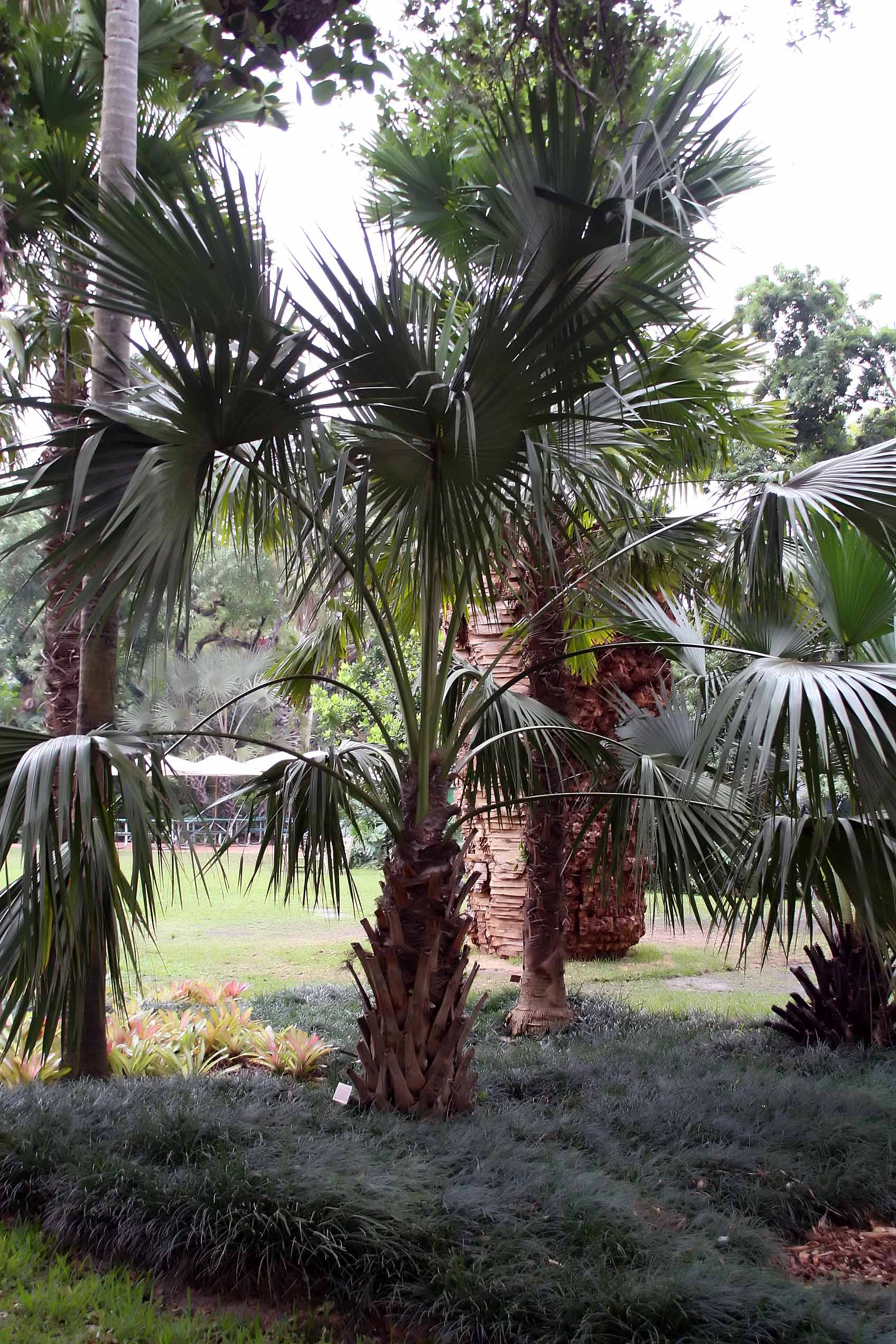

Scientific classification
- Kingdom: Plantae
- Clade: Tracheophytes
- Clade: Angiosperms
- Clade: Monocots
- Clade: Commelinids
- Order: Arecales
- Family: Arecaceae
- Tribe: Trachycarpeae
- Genus: Livistona
- Species: L. rigida

Binomial name
- Livistona rigida Becc.

Synonyms
- Livistona mariae subsp. rigida (Becc.) Rodd

= Livistona rigida =

Species of palm

Livistona rigida, commonly known as the Mataranka palm or Gregory River cabbage palm, is a species of flowering plant in the family Arecaceae. It is a palm tree native to the northern Northern Territory and northwestern Queensland in Australia.

Plants grow up 28 meters tall. They are functionally dioecious, flowering from June to December and fruiting from November to May.

The species is native to the catchments of the Gregory, Leichhardt, Nicholson, Albert, and Flinders rivers in north-western Queensland, and to the Roper and South Alligator rivers and East Arnhem Land in the Northern Territory. The palms grow in riparian habitats along stream margins, on seasonally inundated banks, and along creek lines and seasonal watercourses from 2 to 300 metres elevation. They grow along both permanent and intermittent streams so long as a permanent shallow water supply is present.
