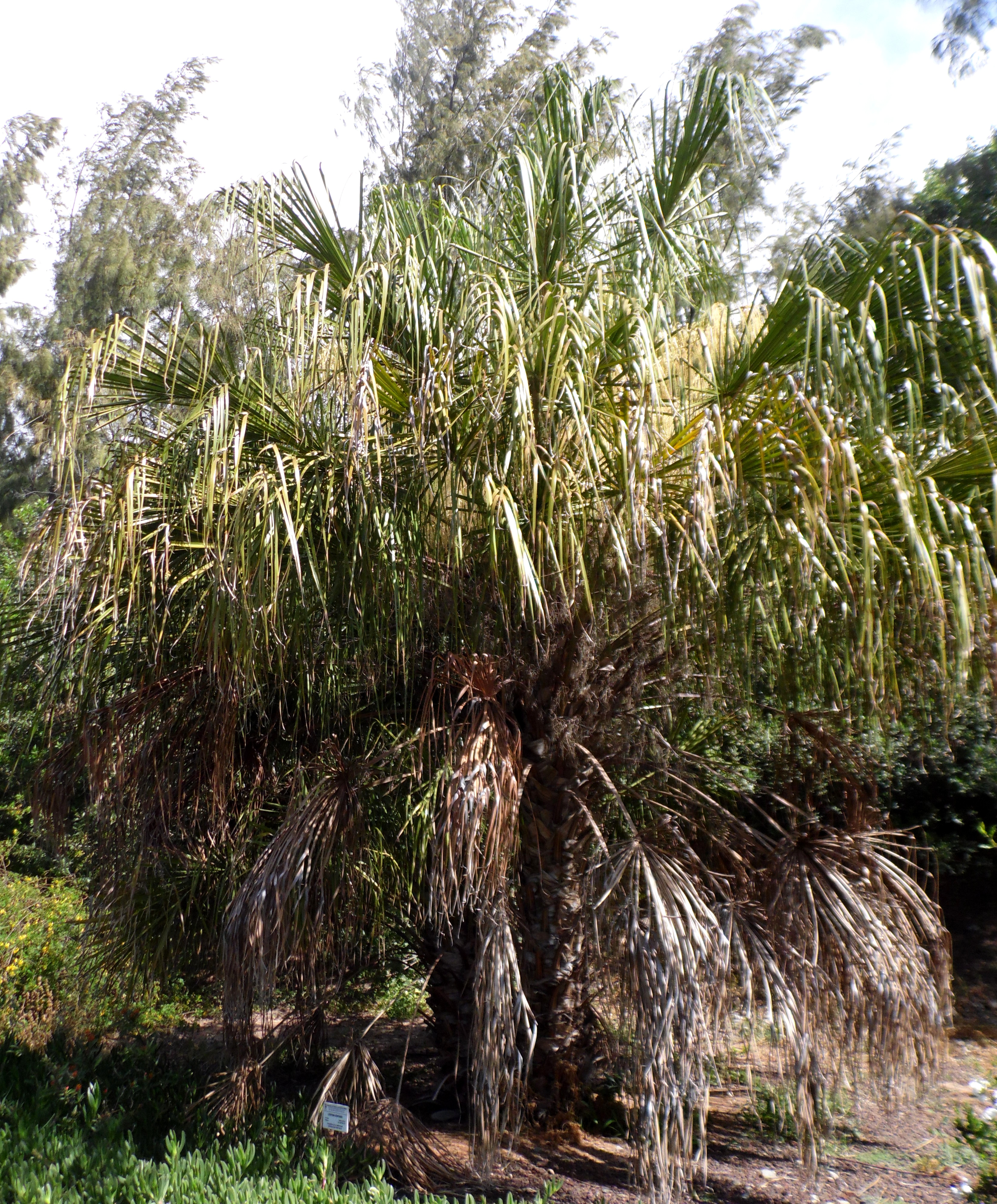
- Cultivated specimen in Maspalomas

Scientific classification
- Kingdom: Plantae
- Clade: Embryophytes
- Clade: Tracheophytes
- Clade: Spermatophytes
- Clade: Angiosperms
- Clade: Monocots
- Clade: Commelinids
- Order: Arecales
- Family: Arecaceae
- Tribe: Trachycarpeae
- Genus: Livistona
- Species: L. benthamii

Binomial name
- Livistona benthamii F.M.Bailey

Synonyms
- Livistona holtzei Becc.; Livistona melanocarpa Burret

= Livistona benthamii =

Species of palm

Livistona benthamii is a species of palm. The natural distribution of this species is from Cape York to the Archer River in Queensland the Northern Territory in Australia and New Guinea. It is a solitary palm found in open forest near areas that are annually inundated. An example may be seen on the Freshwater lake Walk at the Cairns also known as Flecker Botanical Garden.
