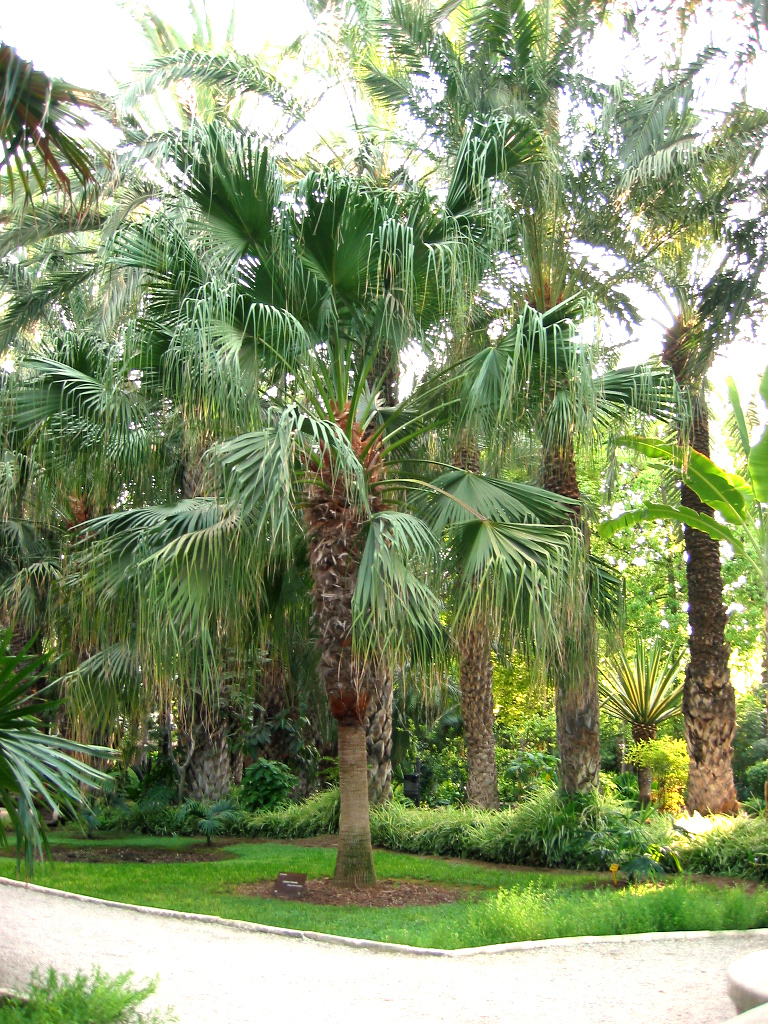

Scientific classification
- Kingdom: Plantae
- Clade: Tracheophytes
- Clade: Angiosperms
- Clade: Monocots
- Clade: Commelinids
- Order: Arecales
- Family: Arecaceae
- Genus: Livistona
- Species: L. chinensis

Binomial name
- Livistona chinensis (Jacq.) R.Br. ex Mart.

Synonyms
- Chamaerops biroo Siebold ex Mart.; Latania chinensis Jacq.; Livistona japonica Nakai ex Masam.; Livistona oliviformis (Hassk.) Mart.; Livistona subglobosa (Hassk.) Mart.; Saribus chinensis (Jacq.) Blume; Saribus oliviformis Hassk.; Saribus subglobosus Hassk.

= Livistona chinensis =

Species of palm

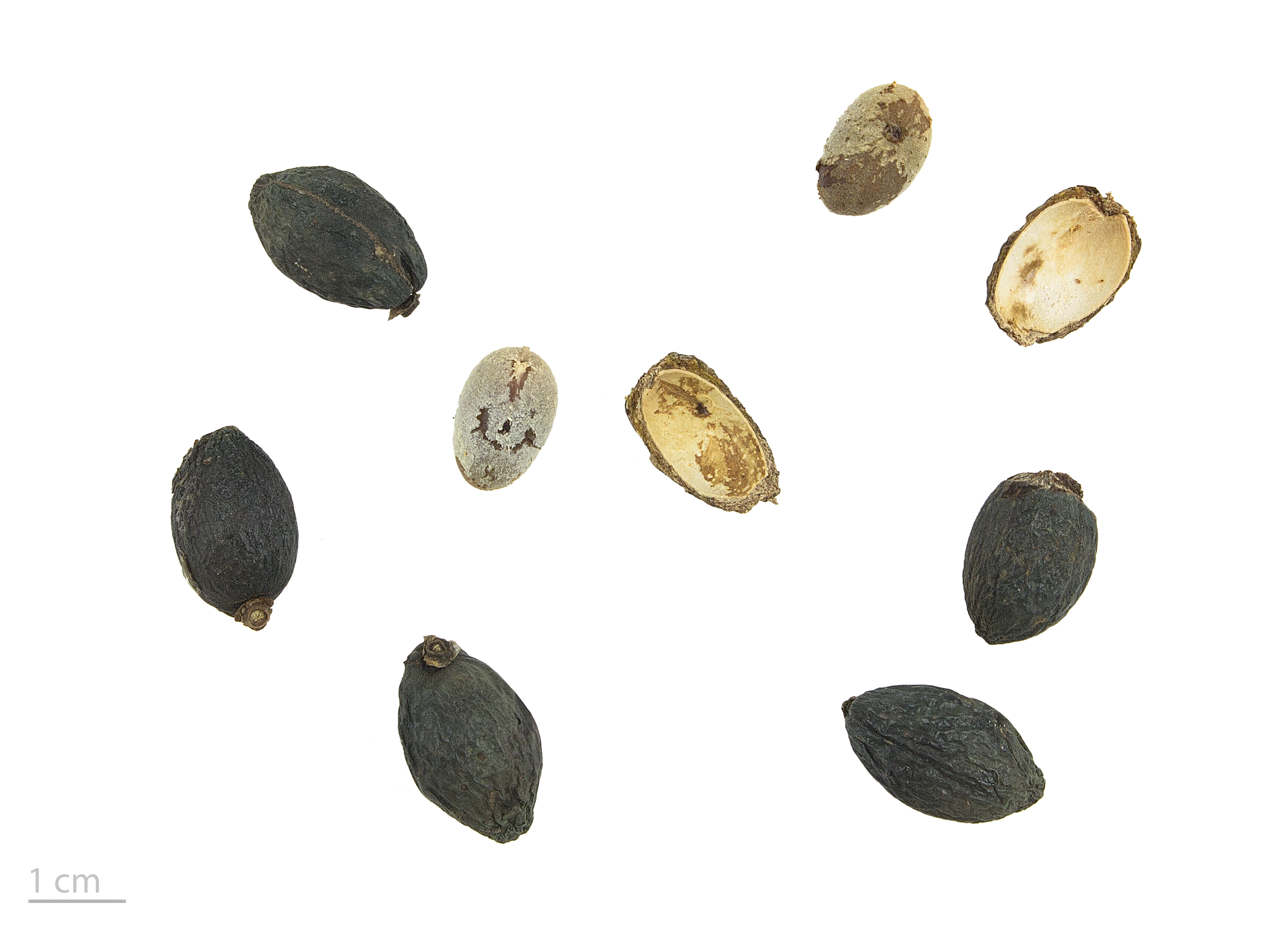
Livistona chinensis - MHNT

Livistona chinensis, the Chinese fan palm or fountain palm, is a species of subtropical palm tree of east Asia. It is native to southern Japan, Taiwan, the Ryukyu Islands, southeastern China and Hainan. In Japan, two notable populations occupy islands near the coast of Miyazaki Prefecture, Aoshima and Tsuki Shima. It is also reportedly naturalized in South Africa, Mauritius, Réunion, the Andaman Islands, Java, New Caledonia, Micronesia, Hawaii, Florida, Bermuda, Puerto Rico and the Dominican Republic.

== Description ==
=== Vegetative characteristics ===
Livistona chinensis can attain heights of about 9 to 15 m (30 to 50 ft) and a spread of 4 m (12 ft). The leaves are fan shaped.

== Cultivation ==
The palm is cultivated as an ornamental tree in gardens and conservatories. It is hardy in USDA zones 9-11, tolerating temperatures down to about 22 °F (−6 °C). They are often grown as a landscape palm in hot and wet tropical and subtropical climates like eastern Australia, Southeast Asia, and the southeast United States.

This plant can become a weed, or in some ecosystems an invasive species, in places such as Bermuda, Hawaii, Florida wetlands and on some Caribbean Islands.
