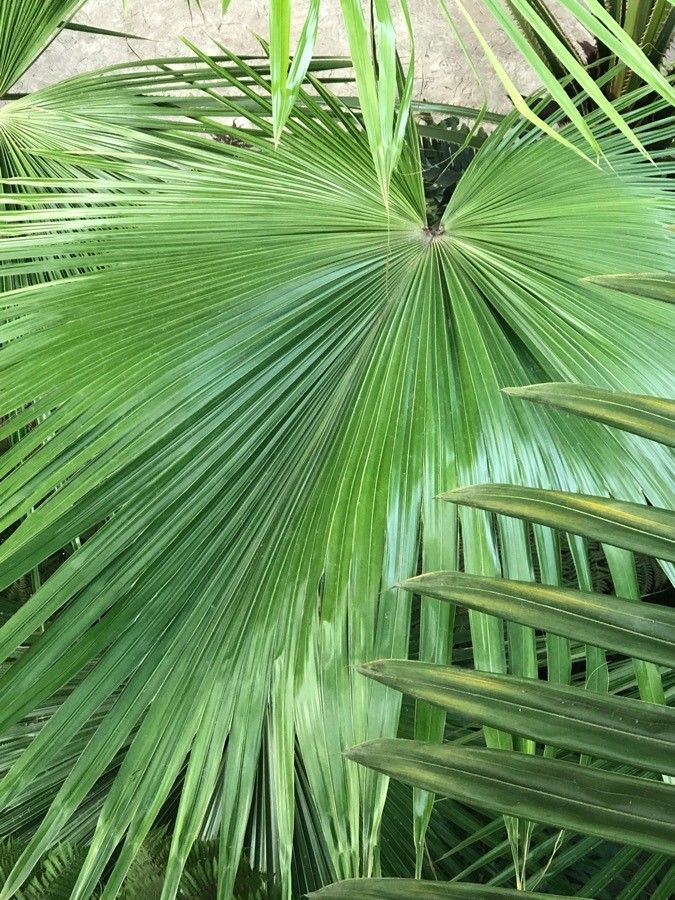

Conservation status
- Least Concern (IUCN 3.1)

Scientific classification
- Kingdom: Plantae
- Clade: Tracheophytes
- Clade: Angiosperms
- Clade: Monocots
- Clade: Commelinids
- Order: Arecales
- Family: Arecaceae
- Tribe: Trachycarpeae
- Genus: Livistona
- Species: L. speciosa

Binomial name
- Livistona speciosa Kurz
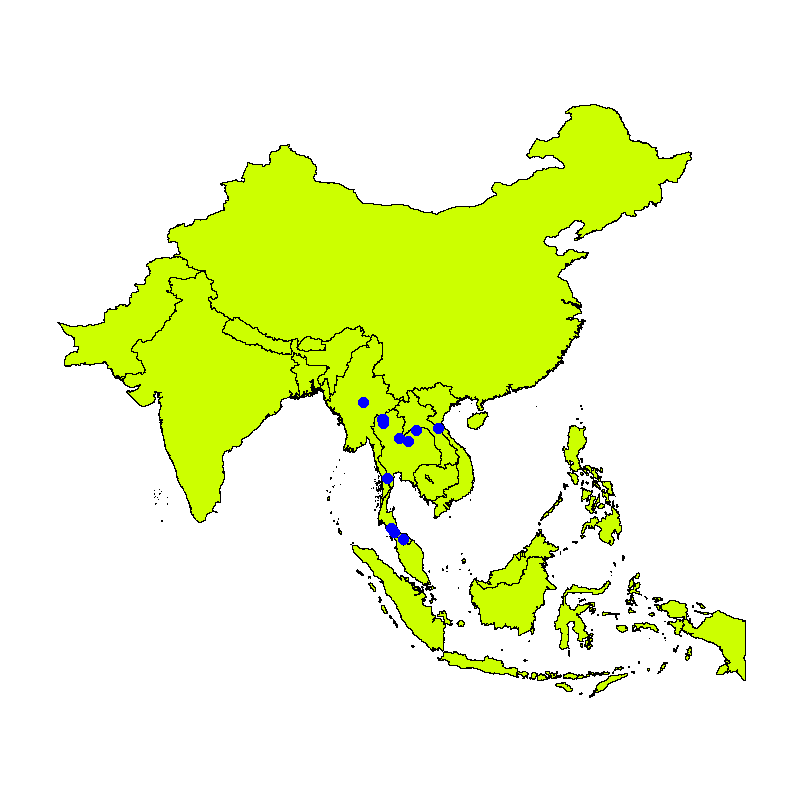
- Occurrence data from GBIF

Synonyms
- Livistona fengkaiensisX.W.Wei & M.Y.Xiao; Saribus speciosus (Kurz) Kuntze

= Livistona speciosa =

Species of palm

Livistona speciosa is a species of fan palm in the family Arecaceae.

== Description and distribution ==
It is a tall palm that can reach 25 m in length and a diameter of 30 cm. It has large fan-shaped leaves.

Livistona speciosa is native from southern China to Vietnam, Thailand, Myanmar, Bangladesh, peninsular Malaysia and Singapore.
