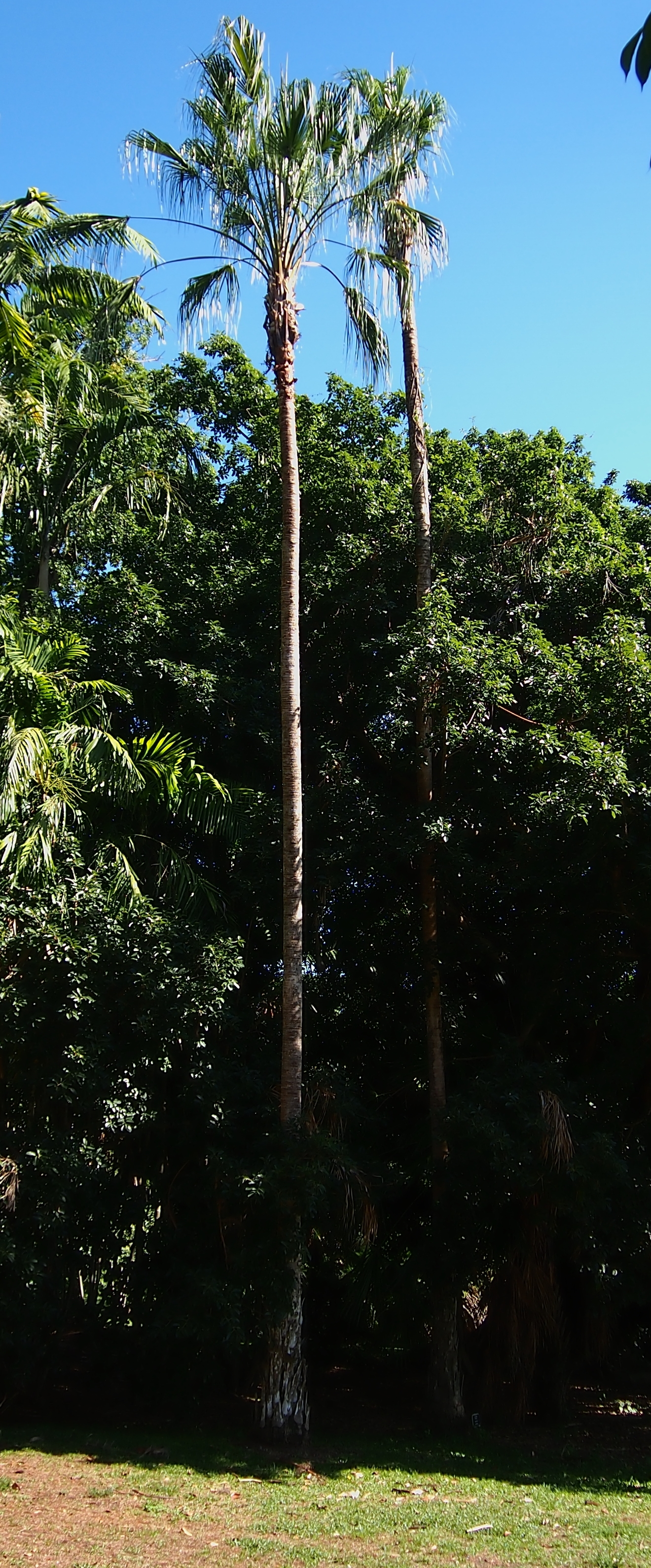

Conservation status
- Endangered (IUCN 2.3)

Scientific classification
- Kingdom: Plantae
- Clade: Tracheophytes
- Clade: Angiosperms
- Clade: Monocots
- Clade: Commelinids
- Order: Arecales
- Family: Arecaceae
- Genus: Livistona
- Species: L. drudei

Binomial name
- Livistona drudei F.Muell. ex W.Watson

= Livistona drudei =

Species of palm

Livistona drudei is a species of palm tree. It is endemic to Queensland in Australia, where it grows in moist forest habitat. It is endangered by loss of habitat.
