= Chamaedorea woodsoniana =

- Chamaedorea woodsoniana leaves and infructescence

Conservation status
- Least Concern (IUCN 3.1)

Scientific classification
- Kingdom: Plantae
- Clade: Tracheophytes
- Clade: Angiosperms
- Clade: Monocots
- Clade: Commelinids
- Order: Arecales
- Family: Arecaceae
- Genus: Chamaedorea
- Species: C. woodsoniana

Binomial name
- Chamaedorea woodsoniana L.H.Bailey

Synonyms
- Chamaedorea vistae Hodel & N. W. Uhl

Species of plant

Infructescence arising below leaves

In habitat

Chamaedorea woodsoniana is a species of palm occurring from Mexico through Central America into northwestern South America. It belongs to the palm family, Arecaceae.

== Description ==
Within the genus Chamaedorea, known for its small-growing species, Chamaedorea woodsoniana is unusually large. However, as a palm in general, it is only medium-size. At first glance looks it like many other palm species, but its particular combination of features distinguish it. Here are its key identification features:

- No spines occur on the entire plant.
- Its slender stems, up to 12 m (39 ft) tall and 10 cm (4 in) in diameter, are encircled by horizontal rings occurring as leaf scars. Spaces between rings are up to 20 cm (8 in) long.
- Its 4-6 leaves, often referred to as fronds, are held erect. They reach 1.5 m (4 ft 11 in) long and each side of the leaf has up to 36 blade segments, or pinnae, up to 65 cm (26 in) long and 5 cm (2 in) broad. Leaf bases wrap around the stem forming a crownshaft about 30 cm (12 in) long.
- Solitary inflorescences arise below the crown of leaves on peduncles up to 75 cm (30 in) long, with the flowering part about equally long. The inflorescence's main axis, the rachis, bears many secondary branches, or "rachillae," which sometimes themselves branch once or twice.
- Flowers are unisexual, with male flowers on one plant, and female ones on another; the plant is dioecious. Flowers of both sexes are partially sunken into the fleshy rachillae. Inflorescences with female flowers develop fewer rachillae, which are shorter and less diffuse.
- The drupe-type fruits are spherical to oblong, up to 20 mm (3/4 in) long and 10 mm (3/8 in) wide. First they are orangish yellow but later turn black.

== Distribution ==
In southern Mexico, Chamaedorea woodsoniana occurs in the states of Chiapas, Oaxaca, Tabasco and Veracruz. It occurs in all Central American countries except El Salvador, and barely enters South America in northwestern Colombia.

== Habitat ==
On the Atlantic side of Nicaragua, Chamaedorea woodsoniana occurs in tropical moist forest, tropical rainforest, cloud forest and dwarf forest. In Mexico it occurs in cloud forests, as secondary vegetation returning after forest removal, (acahuales), and in agroecosystems where trees provide shade for crops such as coffee (cafetales).

Studies in a forest on the lower slopes of a mountain forest in Panama found that Chamaedorea woodsoniana grew in nitrogen-rich soils and had a low relative growth rate. Its survival rate during the study period was unusually low. It grew in dacitic soil.

== Conservation status ==
Though the IUCN classifies Chamaedorea woodsoniana as a Least-concern species, within Mexico researchers describe it as threatened.

== As traditional food ==
In the Mexican state of Veracruz, among the Popoluca and y Nahuas people, immature inflorescences of Chamaedorea woodsoniana, known as cogollos, are eaten. In the Mexican state of Chiapas, among the Lacandon people, the fruits, known as pacaya, are eaten.

== In landscaping ==
Relative to other palm species, Chamaedorea woodsoniana is not often planted, one reason being because it is not a true, shade-needing understory palm, nor a palm for full sunlight; it does best beneath taller canopy trees. Nonetheless, its ringed, green trunk, similar to green bamboo, is considered ornamental. The species is occasionally sold in palm specialty nurseries.

== Taxonomy ==
In 1943 when Liberty Hyde Bailey formally described and named Chamaedorea woodsoniana, he remarked that his type specimen was collected in 1939 by "Allen," his #1901, in the vicinity of El Valle de Antón, Coclé, Panama. The collector Allen was Paul H. Allen.

=== Phylogeny ===
Among 20 Chamaedorea species studied, a phylogenetic analysis focusing mainly on polyploidy and other mechanisms of genome size found Chamaedorea woodsoniana to be sister to a clade containing Chamaedorea arenbergiana, Chamaedorea tepejilote, Chamaedorea alternans and Chamaedorea cataractarum.

=== Etymology ===
The genus name Chamaedorea is constructed of the Greek chamai, meaning "on the ground," and dorea, meaning "gift." This refers to the small, low-growing nature typical of the genus, which are of great beauty.

The species name woodsoniana undoubtedly is named for Robert Everard Woodson who led a long series of expeditions into the little-known area of Panama, and contributed greatly to the Flora of Panama.
