= C. metallica =

C. metallica may refer to:

- Calliotropis metallica, a sea snail species
- Calliphora metallica, a fly species in the genus Calliphora
- Chamaedorea metallica, a flowering plant species endemic to southern Mexico
- Choreutis metallica, a moth species found in Queensland, Australia
- Cola metallica, a flowering plant species found only in Cameroon

== Synonyms ==
- Coleophora metallica, a synonym for Coleophora amethystinella, a moth species found in the Mediterranean Region from Portugal to Iraq

== See also ==
- Metallica (disambiguation)
