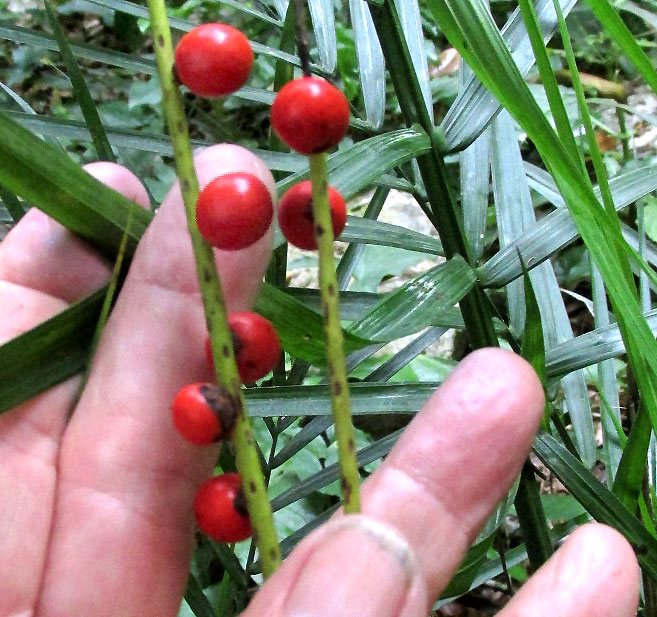
- Chamaedorea radicalis with red fruits

Scientific classification
- Kingdom: Plantae
- Clade: Tracheophytes
- Clade: Angiosperms
- Clade: Monocots
- Clade: Commelinids
- Order: Arecales
- Family: Arecaceae
- Genus: Chamaedorea
- Species: C. radicalis

Binomial name
- Chamaedorea radicalis Mart.

Synonyms
- Nunnezharia radicalis (Mart.) Kuntze; Chamaedorea pringlei S. Watson

= Chamaedorea radicalis =

Species of plant

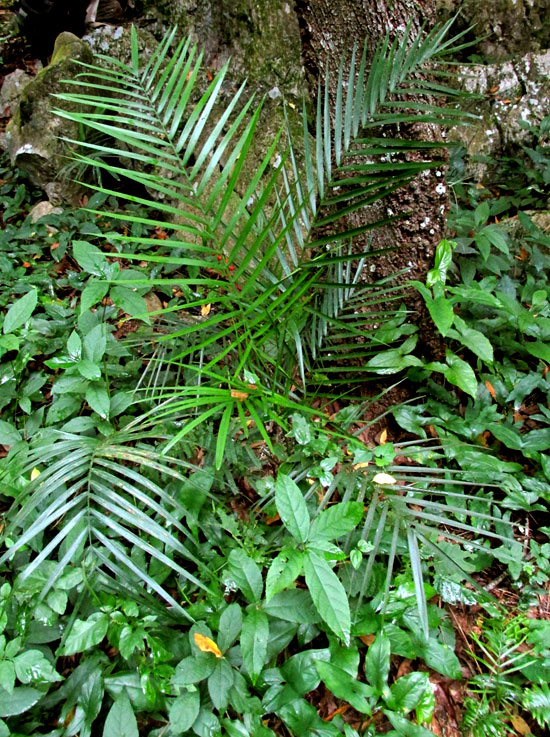
Plant growing wild in forest understory

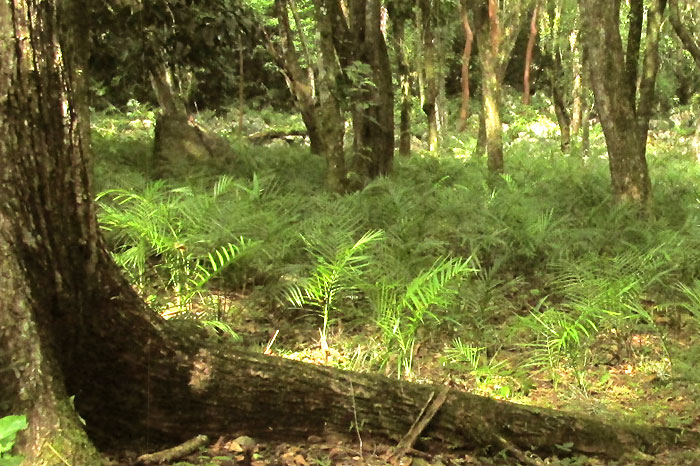
Plantation in forest understory

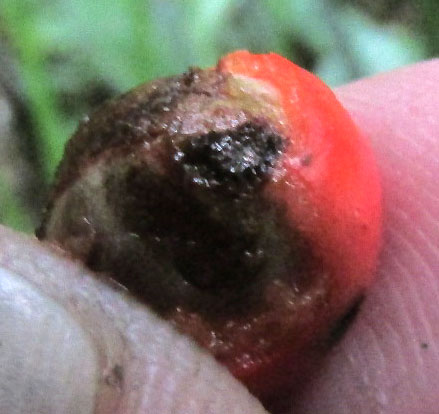
Drupe-type fruit with black seed

Chamaedorea radicalis, the Mexican parlor palm, radicalis palm or hardy parlor palm, is a species of flowering plant and is native to Mexico. Because of its attractive leaves and hardiness it is commercialized widely outside the country. It belongs to the family Arecaceae.

== Description ==
Chamaedorea radicalis can be distinguished from many similar species of small palms with slender, cane-like stems by these distinguishing features:

- Mature plants may develop short, curved, subterranean stems, develop very short stems, or else stems may reach up to 4 m (13 ft) tall and 4 cm (1 5/8 in) in diameter. Plants normally grow solitarily. When aboveground, stems are green, smooth, ringed, with sections between rings, or "internodes," up to 15 cm (6 in) long.
- Plants bear 4-8 unarmed leaves. Individual leaf bases consist of a "sheath" up to 25 cm (10 in) long which wraps around any stem which may be present or else other leaves emerge within the sheath. The sheath gives way to the leaf's petiole, which is up to 30 cm (12 in) long, and atop the petiole arises the pinnately divided blade, with 10-18 or sometimes more stiff subdivisions, or pinnae, on each side of the blade's midrib, or rachis. Pinnae are up to 40 cm (15 1/2 in) and 2.5 cm (1 in) wide, the terminal ones often wider.
- Inflorescences arise between leaves, though on stemless plants they may appear to come from the ground. They have peduncles up to 1 m (3 ft 3 in) long, as long or longer than the leaves. Atop the peduncle, the flowering area consists of a central axis, the "rachis," which usually is branched with flowers arising from as many as 20 "rachillas," these up 30 cm (12 in) long and spreading. Sometimes lower rachillas branch.
- Plants bear either all male or all female flowers; they are monoecious, though there are reports of lone plants producing viable seeds. Male flowers cluster in groups of 2-4 and have 3 green petals about 3 mm (1/8 in) long and broad and 6 stamens. Female flowers also about 3 mm (1/8 in) across appear singly, partly sunken into the rachillae, with 3 petals which grow tight against the single short, more or less spherical pistil
- Drupe-type fruits about 12 mm (1/2 in) long and 9 mm (3/8 in) wide are green changing to yellow, then orange, and finally red with a silvery or "glaucous" bloom when completely ripe.

== Distribution ==
Chamaedorea radicalis is endemic only to the Mexican states of Durango, Hidalgo, Jalisco, Nayarit, Nuevo León, Querétaro, San Luis Potosí, Tamaulipas and Veracruz.

== Habitat ==
In Mexico's central state of Querétaro, Chamaedorea radicalis occurs in cloud forests, oak forests, pine-oak forest, as well as tropical forests with deciduous and subdeciduous leaves, at elevations of 250 to 1,300 m (820 to 4,270 ft).

== Ecology ==
In their native habitat, insects feed on leaves of Chamaedorea radicalis, eliminating about 20% of the foliage annually. The hardness of the leaves appears to be the species' main defense against this threat.

== Conservation status ==
The conservation status of Chamaedorea radicalis is not rated by an international body such as the IUCN. However, the species is described as vulnerable in certain studies, and by outside observers.

== As a cultivated ornamental ==
=== In pots and gardens ===
Mexican parlor palms are marketed both as potted plants and for home gardens. An important selling point is, as one supplier says, it is "undoubtedly the hardiest of all the Chamaedorea, this low-growing palm can tolerate temperatures down to an amazing -10°C (14°F)."

As potted plants, Mexican parlor palms are appreciated as a low maintenance palm which is drought tolerant and cold hardy, and especially suited for shady areas, where its "...dramatic foliage and scarlet fruit are sure to stand out." It does not spread or clump like other Chamaedorea species.

For outside gardens, two distinct forms are recognized: a form with no trunk or a very short one, and the relatively rare tree-like form with a trunk. In the home garden, its main attractions are its cold hardiness, and its attractive dark green, slightly glossy, fern-like leaves. However, rarely are there more than 6 leaves, even when mature, plus it is slow growing.

=== Threats of commercialization of the fronds ===
At least seven Chamaedorea species are harvested for use in the international "cut-greens trade," and Chamaedorea radicalis is one of them; the most commercialized species is Chamaedorea elegans. As of 2004, buyers bought leaves by weight, resulting in even damaged, unsightly leaves being purchased, though such leaves would be of value to the plants if left unharvested. The ornamental green foliage is used in large cut-flower arrangements.

In certain parts of the natural distribution area of Chamaedorea radicalis there are understory plantations of the palm cultivated by local people. The harvesting and sale of the palm's ornamental leaves constitute the main source of income for certain communities, and are considered vital for the subsistence of the communities.

However, studies show that collecting leaves may not be a stable source of income. Chamaedorea radicalis produces approximately two leaves per year. Intense harvesting, with communities often competing for leaves, results in diminished leaf size and increased stress on the plants.

While in their native environment insects may eliminate around 20% of the foliage of Chamaedorea radicalis annually, local farmers collecting fronds for sale to the international market remove around 40%. Farmers harvest fronds not only from their forest-floor plantations, but also from wild plants growing nearby. Thus, over-harvesting of fronds is the main threat to survival of Chamaedorea radicalis in its native environment. In 1999, 2,000 t (2,200 short tons) of fronds of Chamaedorea radicalis were sold from eight Mexican states.

== Taxonomy ==
In 1849 when Carl Friedrich Philipp von Martius formally described Chamaedorea radicalis he remarked that he had seen a living male specimen or flower ("V. V. masc.") in the Regia Monacensis ("h. R. Monac."), which now is the Bayerische Staatsbibliothek (Bavarian State Library) and the Botanische Staatssammlung München (Bavarian State Collection for Botany) in Munich, Germany.

=== Etymology ===
The genus name Chamaedorea is derived from the Greek chamai, meaning "on the ground," and dorea, meaning "gift." This refers to species in the genus being small, low-growing palms of great beauty, thus eligible to be a gift.

The species name radicalis is from the Latin radicalis, meaning "basal, or arising from the root stock." This refers to the apparently stemless form on which leaves and inflorescences appear to arise from the ground.
