= Tithraustes noctiluces =

Scientific classification
- Kingdom: Animalia
- Phylum: Arthropoda
- Clade: Pancrustacea
- Class: Insecta
- Order: Lepidoptera
- Superfamily: Noctuoidea
- Family: Notodontidae
- Genus: Tithraustes
- Species: T. noctiluces

Binomial name
- Tithraustes noctiluces (Butler, 1872)

Synonyms
- Dioptis noctiluces Butler, 1872; Dioptis salvini C. Felder & R. Felder, 1874

Species of moth

Tithraustes noctiluces is a moth of the family Notodontidae. It is found in Panama, Costa Rica and El Salvador.

It is the smallest species in the genus Tithraustes with a forewing length of 10.5–13 mm for males.

Larvae have been reared on Heliconia latispatha and palms in four different genera: Asterogyne martiana, Calyptrogyne trichostachys, Chamaedorea tepejilote and Geonoma cuneata.
