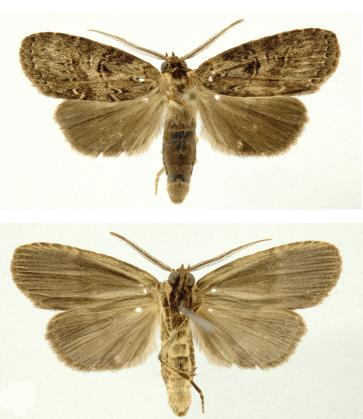
- Male
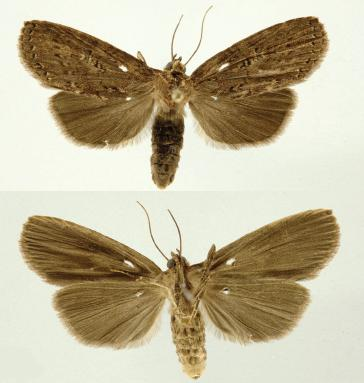
- Female

Scientific classification
- Kingdom: Animalia
- Phylum: Arthropoda
- Clade: Pancrustacea
- Class: Insecta
- Order: Lepidoptera
- Superfamily: Noctuoidea
- Family: Notodontidae
- Genus: Dunama
- Species: D. jessiebancroftae

Binomial name
- Dunama jessiebancroftae Chacón, 2013

= Dunama jessiebancroftae =

Species of moth

Dunama jessiebancroftae is a moth in the family Notodontidae. It is found in Costa Rica, where it is known from the Peninsula de Nicoya, and the lowlands of central Pacific Costa Rica, at elevations ranging from 50 to 1,286 metres (164 to 4,219 ft).

== Description ==
The length of the forewings is 16.4–17 mm. The dorsal ground color is a mixture of gray-brown, blackish-brown and beige scales. The veins are lined with gray, especially distally. The anal fold and cubitus are blackish brown and the orbicular spot is diffuse blackish brown. The reniform spot is small and blackish brown. The ventral surfaces of both wings are gray brown and the dorsal hindwing is dirty gray brown, but lighter near the base.

== Biology ==
The larvae feed on Bactris major, Chamaedorea costaricana and Geonoma cuneata.

== Etymology ==
The species is named in honor of Ms. Jessie Bancroft, grandmother of Jessie Hill of Philadelphia and Hawaii, in recognition of Jessie Hill’s contribution to saving and inventorying the conserved ACG rain forest in which Dunama jessiebancroftae breeds.

== Gallery ==
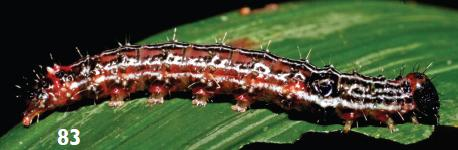
Larvae - last instar
