= Dunama mexicana =

Scientific classification
- Domain: Eukaryota
- Kingdom: Animalia
- Phylum: Arthropoda
- Class: Insecta
- Order: Lepidoptera
- Superfamily: Noctuoidea
- Family: Notodontidae
- Genus: Dunama
- Species: D. mexicana

Binomial name
- Dunama mexicana Todd, 1976

Species of moth

Dunama mexicana is a moth in the family Notodontidae. It is found in Mexico.

The length of the forewings is 11–15 mm for males and 12–17 mm for females.

The larvae feed on Chamaedorea species.
