= Tithraustes snyderi =

Scientific classification
- Kingdom: Animalia
- Phylum: Arthropoda
- Clade: Pancrustacea
- Class: Insecta
- Order: Lepidoptera
- Superfamily: Noctuoidea
- Family: Notodontidae
- Genus: Tithraustes
- Species: T. snyderi

Binomial name
- Tithraustes snyderi Miller, 2008

Species of moth

Tithraustes snyderi is a moth of the family Notodontidae. It is found in cloud-forest habitats within La Amistad, an international park extending from south-central Costa Rica into the Chiriqui Province of Panama.

The length of the forewings is 12.5–13 mm for males and 15 mm for females.

The larvae feed on Chamaedorea costaricana, Chamaedorea crucensis and Geonoma edulis.

== Etymology ==
The species is named in honor of Cal Snyder.
