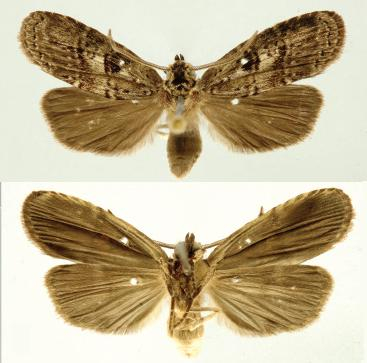
- Male
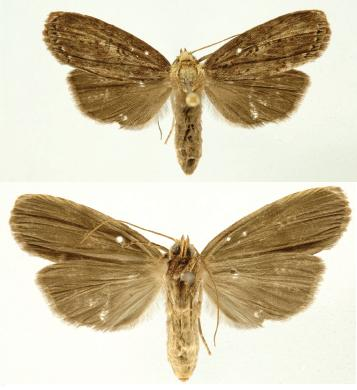
- Female

Scientific classification
- Kingdom: Animalia
- Phylum: Arthropoda
- Class: Insecta
- Order: Lepidoptera
- Superfamily: Noctuoidea
- Family: Notodontidae
- Genus: Dunama
- Species: D. jessiehillae

Binomial name
- Dunama jessiehillae Chacón, 2013

= Dunama jessiehillae =

Species of moth

Dunama jessiehillae is a moth in the family Notodontidae. It is found in Costa Rica, where it is only known from the east slope of the Cordillera Volcanica de Guanacaste and Tilaran, and in the Sarapiqui lowlands, at elevations ranging from 40 to 1,500 meters. Larvae have only been encountered at mid-elevations on the same slopes.

== Description ==
The length of the forewings is 10.7–13.3 mm. The forewing dorsal ground color is a mixture of gray-brown, reddish-brown and beige-colored scales. The veins are lined with gray, especially distally. The anal fold and cubitus are reddish brown and the orbicular spot is diffuse reddish brown. The reniform spot is small and reddish brown. The ventral surfaces of both wings are gray brown and the dorsal hindwing is dirty gray brown, but lighter near the base.

== Biology ==
The larvae feed on Asterogyne martiana, Astrocaryum alatum, Calyptrogyne trichostachys, Chamaedorea pinnatifrons, Chamaedorea tepejilote, Chamaedorea warscewiczii, Cryosophila warscewiczii, Geonoma congesta, Geonoma cuneata, Geonoma ferruginea, Geonoma interrupta, Iriartea deltoidea, Prestoea decurrens and Welfia regia. The eggs are laid in small batches of five to forty. The caterpillars may remain together through the penultimate instar, but generally forage separately in the last instar. Cocoons are solitary and generally made in a fold of the palm leaf or two pinnae one on top of the other. The cocoons are lightly silked together. The relatively conspicuous caterpillars remain on the leaf when disturbed rather than drop to the ground, implying that they may be aposematic or mimetic even though they are commonly difficult to encounter among overlapping leaf parts, and often on the underside of the leaf.

== Etymology ==
The species is named in honor of Ms. Jessie Hill of Hawaii and Philadelphia, and great-great-granddaughter of Ms. Jessie Barron, and in emphatic recognition of Jessie Hill's contribution to saving and inventorying the conserved Guanacaste Conservation Area forests in which Dunama jessiehillae and four other new species of Dunama reside.

== Gallery ==
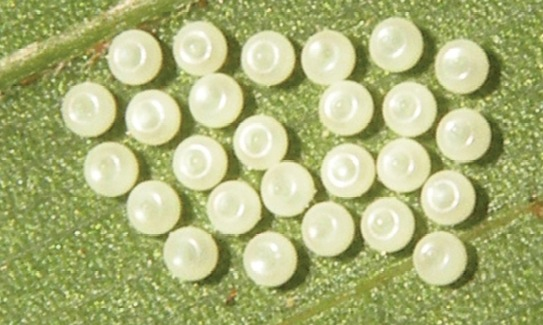
Eggs

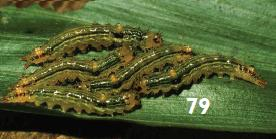
Larvae - penultimate instar

Larvae - last instar

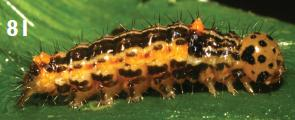
Prepupa
