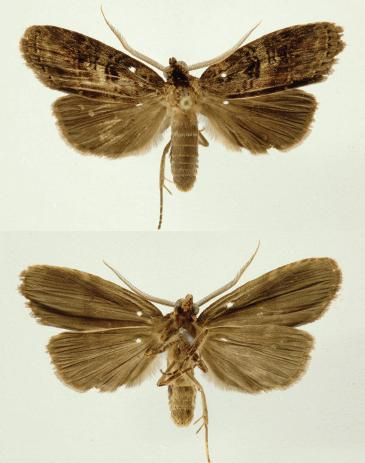
- Male
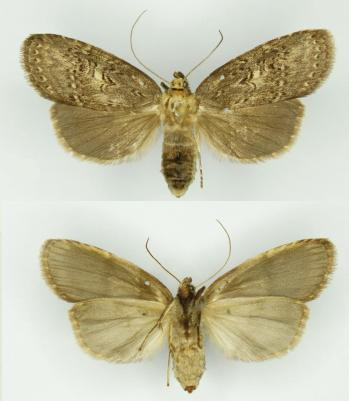
- Female

Scientific classification
- Kingdom: Animalia
- Phylum: Arthropoda
- Class: Insecta
- Order: Lepidoptera
- Superfamily: Noctuoidea
- Family: Notodontidae
- Genus: Dunama
- Species: D. janecoxae

Binomial name
- Dunama janecoxae Chacón, 2013

= Dunama janecoxae =

Species of moth

Dunama janecoxae is a moth in the family Notodontidae. It is found in Costa Rica, where it is known from the Cordillera Volcanica de Guanacaste and the eastern slope of the Cordillera de Tilaran and Talamanca, occurring at elevations ranging from 1,090 to 1,185 meters.

== Description ==
The length of the forewings is 16.1–17.4 mm. The dorsal ground color is a mixture of gray-brown and beige scales. The veins are lined with gray, especially distally. The anal fold and cubitus are blackish brown and the orbicular spot is diffuse blackish brown. The reniform spot is small and blackish brown. The dorsal hindwing is dirty gray brown, but lighter near the base. The ventral surfaces of both wings are gray brown.

== Biology ==
The larvae feed on Chamaedorea costaricana.

== Etymology ==
The species is named in honor of Ms. Jane Cox, mother of Jessie Hill of Philadelphia and Hawaii, in recognition of Jessie Hill’s contribution to saving and inventorying the conserved ACG rain forest in which Dunama janecoxae breeds.

== Gallery ==
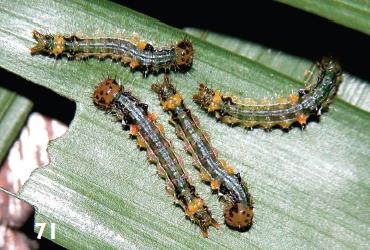
Larvae - last instar

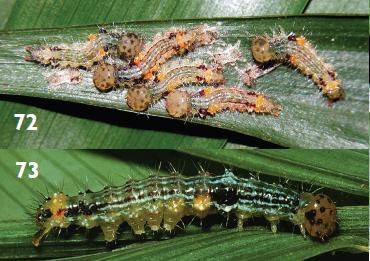
Larvae - last instar
