= Tithraustes quinquepunctata =

Scientific classification
- Kingdom: Animalia
- Phylum: Arthropoda
- Clade: Pancrustacea
- Class: Insecta
- Order: Lepidoptera
- Superfamily: Noctuoidea
- Family: Notodontidae
- Genus: Tithraustes
- Species: T. quinquepunctata

Binomial name
- Tithraustes quinquepunctata Warren, 1901

Species of moth

Tithraustes quinquepunctata is a moth of the family Notodontidae. It is found in Panama.

Adults have a contrasting white and chocolate-brown wing pattern.
