= Janet Plowe =

American biologist

Janet Quentin Plowe
- Born: c. 1905; California
- Died: Unknown
- Education: M.A., Stanford University, 1922; Ph.D., University of Pennsylvania, 1930
- Known for: Pioneer of Micro-injection
- Scientific career
- Fields: Biology
- Academic advisors: William Seifriz

Janet Quentin Plowe was a biologist credited for helping to discover the cell membrane.

== Biography ==
In 1931 she demonstrated that the cell membrane is physical, instead of an interface between two different liquids. Janet Plowe was born in 1905 in California.

Plowe, a student of William Seifriz, was among the pioneers of micro-injection into plant cells.

She discovered the elasticity and composition of several large organelles, and the cell membrane itself.
