= Dunama mattonii =

Scientific classification
- Kingdom: Animalia
- Phylum: Arthropoda
- Class: Insecta
- Order: Lepidoptera
- Superfamily: Noctuoidea
- Family: Notodontidae
- Genus: Dunama
- Species: D. mattonii

Binomial name
- Dunama mattonii J.S. Miller, 2011

Species of moth

Dunama mattonii is a moth in the family Notodontidae. It is found in Ecuador.

The length of the forewings is 16–18 mm for males and about 20 mm for females.

The larvae feed on Geonoma orbignyana.
