= Chamaedorea tuerckheimii =

Scientific classification
- Kingdom: Plantae
- Clade: Tracheophytes
- Clade: Angiosperms
- Clade: Monocots
- Clade: Commelinids
- Order: Arecales
- Family: Arecaceae
- Genus: Chamaedorea
- Species: C. tuerckheimii

Binomial name
- Chamaedorea tuerckheimii (Dammer) Burret

Species of plant

Chamaedora tuerckheimii, commonly called the potato chip palm or guoney, is a member of the palm family Arecaceae (syn. Palmae), with two subspecies displaying disjunct distribution in Guatemala and Veracruz, Mexico. The Guatemalan subspecies has the thinnest stem of any palm, only 3 mm (0.12 in) in diameter. The largest Borassus aethiopum would be more than 600 times thicker. The other, Veracruz, subspecies, is distinguished by having a white border around the edge of each leaf.
