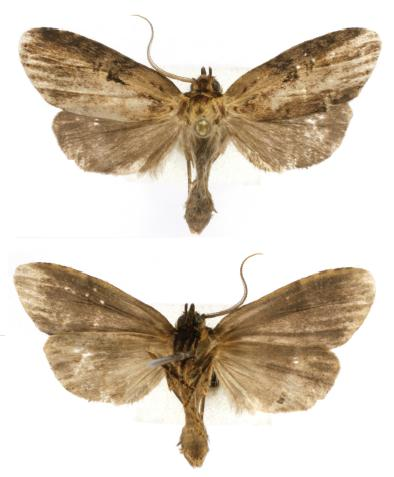
- Male
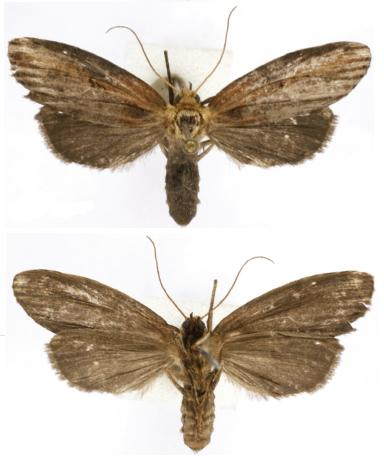
- Female

Scientific classification
- Kingdom: Animalia
- Phylum: Arthropoda
- Class: Insecta
- Order: Lepidoptera
- Superfamily: Noctuoidea
- Family: Notodontidae
- Genus: Dunama
- Species: D. indereci

Binomial name
- Dunama indereci Chacón, 2013

= Dunama indereci =

Species of moth

Dunama indereci is a moth in the family Notodontidae. It is found in Costa Rica, where it is known from the Villa Blanca, in San Ramon, Alajuela province, at an elevation of 1,115 meters in a montane pass between Costa Rica’s Cordillera de Tilaran and the Volcanica Central.

== Description ==
The length of the forewings is 11.8–12.9 mm. The dorsal ground color is a mixture of gray-brown and beige scales. The veins are lined with gray, especially distally. The anal fold and cubitus are light brown and the orbicular spot is blackish brown. The reniform spot is diffuse and blackish brown and the fringe is gray brown. The dorsal hindwing is gray brown. The ventral surfaces of both wings is gray brown.

== Biology ==
The larvae feed on Heliconia latispatha.

== Etymology ==
The species is named in honor of the International Development Research Centre (IDRC) of Canada in recognition of their support of information management and DNA barcode taxonomy at INBio for conservation, and particularly for its support of the International Barcode of Life Project (iBOL initiated by the Biodiversity Institute of Ontario at the University of Guelph, Canada).

== Gallery ==
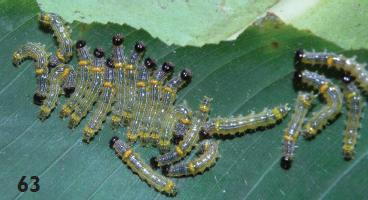
Larvae - intermediate instar

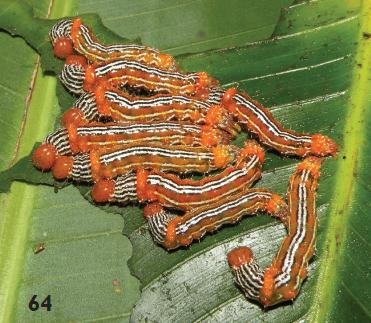
Larvae - last instar
