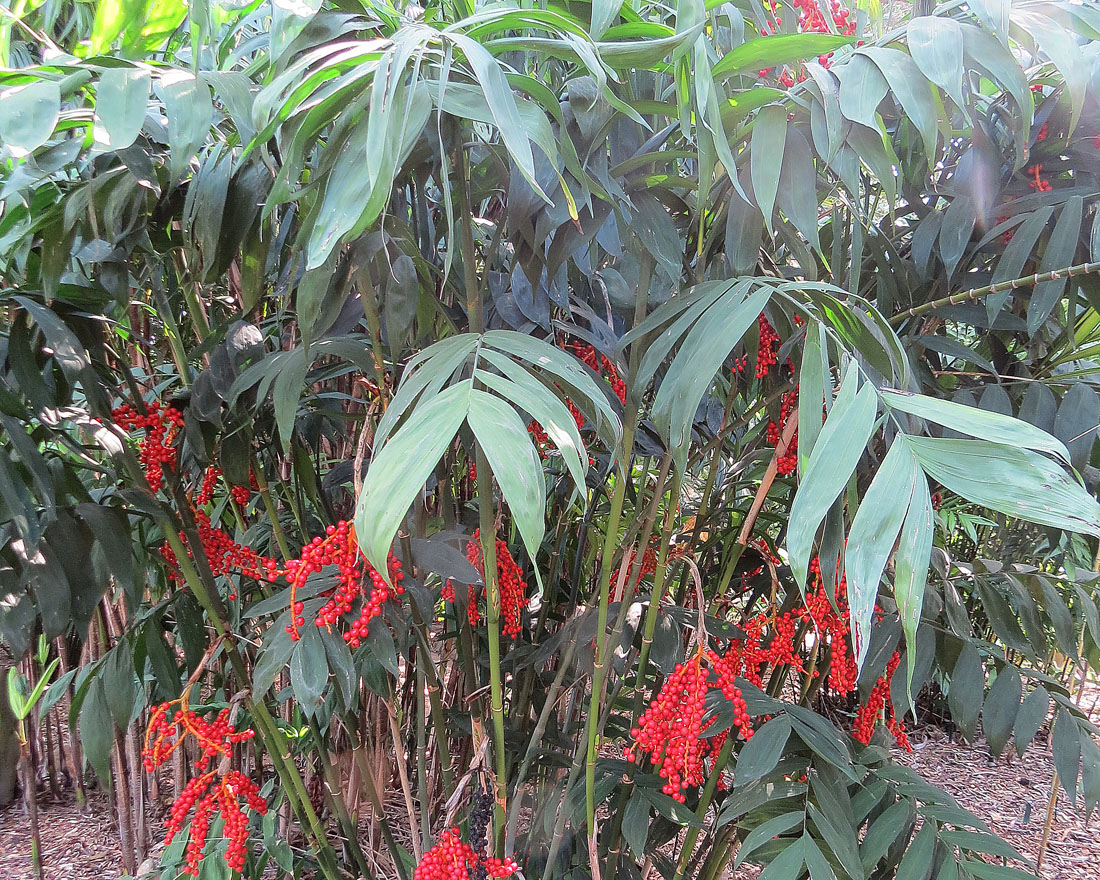
- Habit
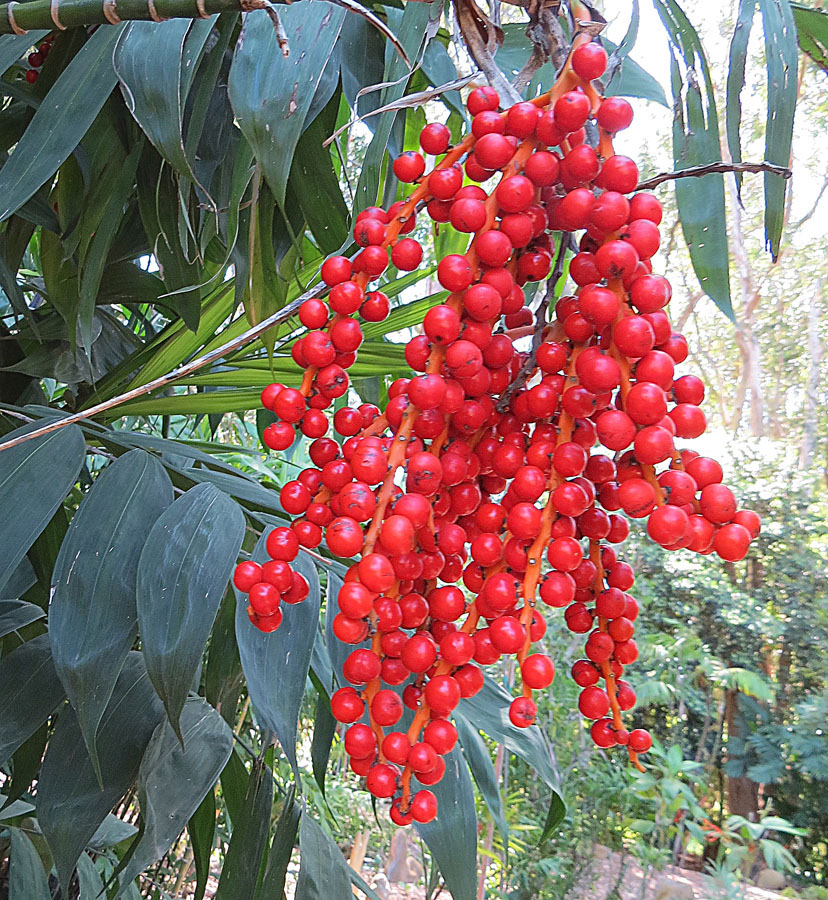
- Close-up of fruit

Conservation status
- Least Concern (IUCN 3.1)

Scientific classification
- Kingdom: Plantae
- Clade: Tracheophytes
- Clade: Angiosperms
- Clade: Monocots
- Clade: Commelinids
- Order: Arecales
- Family: Arecaceae
- Genus: Chamaedorea
- Species: C. microspadix

Binomial name
- Chamaedorea microspadix Burret

= Chamaedorea microspadix =

Species of plant

Chamaedorea microspadix, or the hardy bamboo palm, is a species of flowering plant in the genus Chamaedorea, native to eastern Mexico (Hidalgo, Querétaro, San Luis Potosí, and Veracruz). It is remarkably cold hardy for a palm, able to survive occasional frosts down to 20 °F (−7 °C). Its multiple stalks are jointed, reminiscent of bamboo canes. It is dioecious.

When growing outdoors it prefers moist soil and indirect sunlight, and typically reaches 8–10 ft (2.4–3.0 m). It does well in homes and commercial buildings, usually only reaching 4–6 ft (1.2–1.8 m) when grown in containers. With its low maintenance requirements and showy red fruit, it has gained the Royal Horticultural Society's Award of Garden Merit.
