= Tithraustes albinigra =

Scientific classification
- Kingdom: Animalia
- Phylum: Arthropoda
- Clade: Pancrustacea
- Class: Insecta
- Order: Lepidoptera
- Superfamily: Noctuoidea
- Family: Notodontidae
- Genus: Tithraustes
- Species: T. albinigra

Binomial name
- Tithraustes albinigra Warren, 1905

Species of moth

Tithraustes albinigra is a moth of the family Notodontidae. It is endemic to cloud forest habitats in northern Panama and southern Costa Rica.

It is one of the smallest members of the genus Tithraustes, with a forewing length of 12.5-13.5 mm.
