= Tithraustes pyrifera =

Scientific classification
- Kingdom: Animalia
- Phylum: Arthropoda
- Clade: Pancrustacea
- Class: Insecta
- Order: Lepidoptera
- Superfamily: Noctuoidea
- Family: Notodontidae
- Genus: Tithraustes
- Species: T. pyrifera

Binomial name
- Tithraustes pyrifera Dognin, 1911

Species of moth

"Tithraustes" pyrifera is a moth of the family Notodontidae. It is found in Colombia.

== Taxonomy ==
The species does not belong in Tithraustes, but has not been placed in another genus yet.
