= Dunama claricentrata =

Scientific classification
- Domain: Eukaryota
- Kingdom: Animalia
- Phylum: Arthropoda
- Class: Insecta
- Order: Lepidoptera
- Superfamily: Noctuoidea
- Family: Notodontidae
- Genus: Dunama
- Species: D. claricentrata

Binomial name
- Dunama claricentrata (Dognin, 1916)

Synonyms
- Eunotela claricentrata Dognin, 1916

Species of moth

Dunama claricentrata is a moth in the family Notodontidae. It is found in French Guiana.
