= Tithraustes haemon =

Scientific classification
- Kingdom: Animalia
- Phylum: Arthropoda
- Clade: Pancrustacea
- Class: Insecta
- Order: Lepidoptera
- Superfamily: Noctuoidea
- Family: Notodontidae
- Genus: Tithraustes
- Species: T. haemon

Binomial name
- Tithraustes haemon H. Druce, 1885

Species of moth

Tithraustes haemon is a moth of the family Notodontidae first described by Herbert Druce in 1885. It is restricted to the Pacific slope of the Cordillera de Talamanca, ranging from southern Costa Rica south into Panama.
