= Tithraustes deiphon =

Scientific classification
- Kingdom: Animalia
- Phylum: Arthropoda
- Clade: Pancrustacea
- Class: Insecta
- Order: Lepidoptera
- Superfamily: Noctuoidea
- Family: Notodontidae
- Genus: Tithraustes
- Species: T. deiphon

Binomial name
- Tithraustes deiphon H. Druce, 1885

Species of moth

Tithraustes deiphon is a moth of the family Notodontidae first described by Herbert Druce in 1885. It is found in Panama and Costa Rica.
