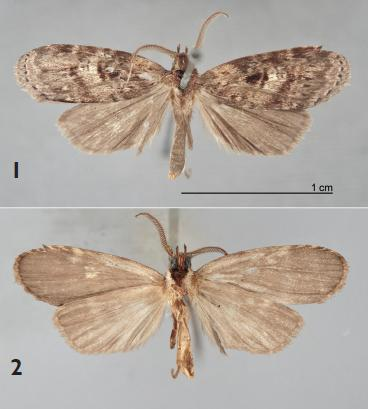

Scientific classification
- Kingdom: Animalia
- Phylum: Arthropoda
- Class: Insecta
- Order: Lepidoptera
- Superfamily: Noctuoidea
- Family: Notodontidae
- Genus: Dunama
- Species: D. angulinea

Binomial name
- Dunama angulinea Schaus, 1912

= Dunama angulinea =

Species of moth

Dunama angulinea is a moth in the family Notodontidae. It is found in Costa Rica, where it is located in the Limon Province. The distribution follows the Caribbean coast and there are no records further inland.

The length of the forewings is 11.2–12.2 mm. The forewing dorsal ground color is a mixture of gray-brown, reddish-brown, and beige-colored scales. The veins are lined with gray, especially distally. The anal fold and cubitus are reddish brown and the orbicular spot is diffuse reddish brown. The reniform spot is small and reddish brown. The ventral surfaces of both wings are gray brown. The dorsal hindwing is dirty gray brown, but lighter near the base.
