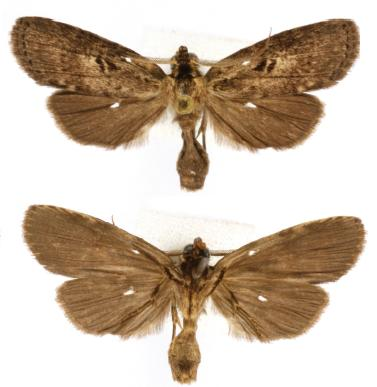
- Male
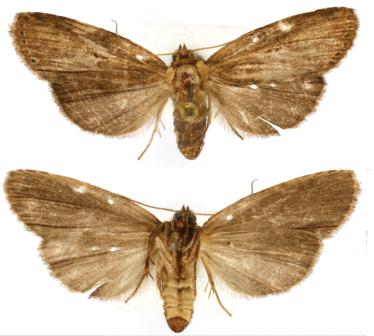
- Female

Scientific classification
- Kingdom: Animalia
- Phylum: Arthropoda
- Class: Insecta
- Order: Lepidoptera
- Superfamily: Noctuoidea
- Family: Notodontidae
- Genus: Dunama
- Species: D. biosise

Binomial name
- Dunama biosise Chacón, 2013

= Dunama biosise =

Species of moth

Dunama biosise is a moth in the family Notodontidae. It is found in Costa Rica, where it is known from the Osa Peninsula, Area de Conservacion Osa at elevations ranging from 0 to 100 meters.

== Description ==
The length of the forewings is 11.7–12.8 mm. The dorsal ground color is a mixture of gray-brown and beige scales. The veins are lined with gray, especially distally. The anal fold and cubitus are light brown and the orbicular spot is diffuse blackish brown. The dorsal hindwing is dirty gray brown, but lighter near the base. The ventral surfaces of both wings are gray brown.

== Etymology ==
The species is named in honor of BIOSIS, a non-profit publishing company, the sale of which generated the JRS Biodiversity Foundation (https://web.archive.org/web/20080821193731/http://www.jrsbdf.org/), which in turn supports biodiversity information management for conservation in many places, including INBio and ACG.
