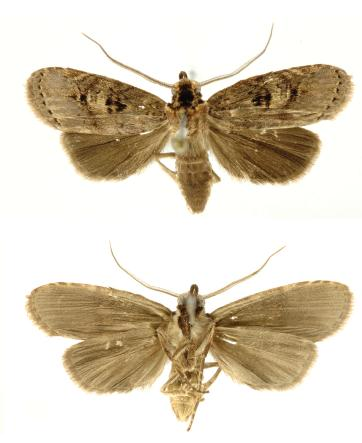
- Dunama janewaldronae

Scientific classification
- Kingdom: Animalia
- Phylum: Arthropoda
- Class: Insecta
- Order: Lepidoptera
- Superfamily: Noctuoidea
- Family: Notodontidae
- Subfamily: Nystaleinae
- Genus: Dunama; Schaus, 1912

Species
- See text

= Dunama =

Genus of moths

Dunama is a genus of moths of the family Notodontidae described by William Schaus in 1912.

== Taxonomy ==
Schaus established the genus Dunama in 1912 for a group of small, relatively drab, mottled and tree-bark patterned, brown notodontid moths with a black orbicular spot. Edward L. Todd revised the genus whose distribution extends from Mexico to Amazonian Brazil in 1976. He described two new species and listed two species, D. angulinea and D. tuna from Costa Rica and D. angulinea was reared in Panama for study in 1976. One additional species was recently described by James S. Miller and Paul Thiaucourt from Ecuador in 2011. The genus traditionally has been placed in the Nystaleinae, but that placement remains provisional because species of Dunama lack the characteristic morphological traits of most nystaleines. Additionally, all known caterpillars of Dunama feed on monocots (Musaceae, Marantaceae, Heliconiaceae, Arecaceae), a trait rarely encountered in the Notodontidae.

=== Species ===
The genus includes the following species:

- Dunama angulinea Schaus, 1912
- Dunama biosise Chacón, 2013
- Dunama claricentrata (Dognin, 1916)
- Dunama indereci Chacón, 2013
- Dunama janecoxae Chacón, 2013
- Dunama janewaldronae Chacón, 2013
- Dunama jessiebancroftae Chacón, 2013
- Dunama jessiebarronae Chacón, 2013
- Dunama jessiehillae Chacón, 2013
- Dunama mattonii J.S. Miller, 2011
- Dunama mexicana Todd, 1976
- Dunama ravistriata Todd, 1976
- Dunama tuna (Schaus, 1901)
