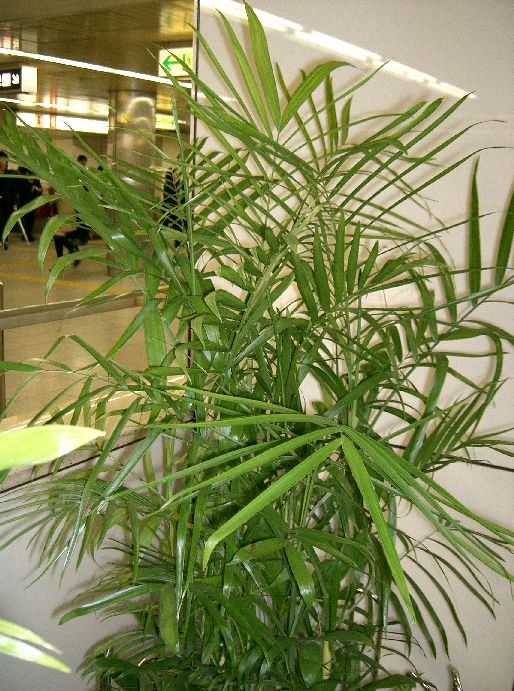

Conservation status
- Least Concern (IUCN 3.1)

Scientific classification
- Kingdom: Plantae
- Clade: Tracheophytes
- Clade: Angiosperms
- Clade: Monocots
- Clade: Commelinids
- Order: Arecales
- Family: Arecaceae
- Genus: Chamaedorea
- Species: C. seifrizii

Binomial name
- Chamaedorea seifrizii Burret

Synonyms
- Chamaedorea donnell-smithii Dammer; Chamaedorea erumpens H.E.Moore; Meiota campechana O.F.Cook

= Chamaedorea seifrizii =

Species of subtropical palm

Chamaedorea seifrizii, commonly known as bamboo palm, parlor palm, or reed palm, is a species of plant in the family Arecaceae. It is a subtropical palm that grows up to 20 feet tall, and is commonly used as a houseplant. The evergreen leaves are pinnately divided, and yellow flowers are borne on a panicle. The fruit are small, round, and black.

== Taxonomy and history ==
Chamaedorea seifrizii was described in 1938 by German botanist Max Burret based on a type specimen collected near Chichén Itzá in Mexico. Burret named the species in honour of William Seifriz, the collector of the type material. The holotype has since been lost, but a neotype was designated by Donald R. Hodel in 1992 and is now stored in the Liberty Hyde Bailey Hortorium.

== Distribution and habitat ==
C. seifrizii is native to Belize (Belize District, Cayo District, Corozal District, and Orange Walk District), Guatemala (Petén Department), Honduras (mainland and Islas de la Bahia), and Mexico (Campeche, Quintana Roo, Tabasco, and Yucatán). It can be found at elevations of up to 500 m (1,600 ft), often on limestone outcrops. It grows in moist woodlands and forests, including disturbed habitat.

It occurs as an introduced species in Florida, United States.

== Cultivation ==
Referred to as xate, xiat, or chiat in Mayan, C. seifrizii was cultivated by the Maya people in the pre-Columbian era as an ornamental plant and possibly for religious purposes, often being planted around villages and temples.

Today, C. seifrizii is widely cultivated as both an indoor and outdoor plant. It is easily propagated from seed or by division.
