= Tithraustes caliginosa =

Scientific classification
- Kingdom: Animalia
- Phylum: Arthropoda
- Clade: Pancrustacea
- Class: Insecta
- Order: Lepidoptera
- Superfamily: Noctuoidea
- Family: Notodontidae
- Genus: Tithraustes
- Species: T. caliginosa

Binomial name
- Tithraustes caliginosa (Dognin, 1902)

Synonyms
- Polypoetes caliginosa Dognin, 1902

Species of moth

"Tithraustes" caliginosa is a moth of the family Notodontidae. It is found in Ecuador.

== Taxonomy ==
The species does not belong in Tithraustes, but has not been placed in another genus yet.
