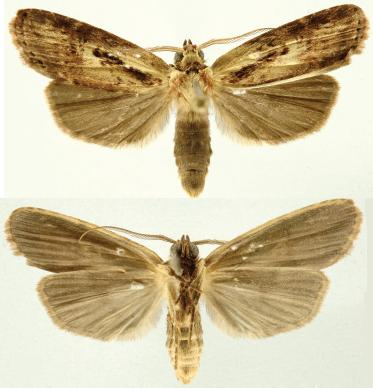
- Male
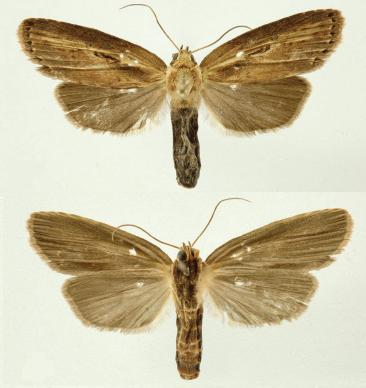
- Female

Scientific classification
- Kingdom: Animalia
- Phylum: Arthropoda
- Class: Insecta
- Order: Lepidoptera
- Superfamily: Noctuoidea
- Family: Notodontidae
- Genus: Dunama
- Species: D. jessiebarronae

Binomial name
- Dunama jessiebarronae Chacón, 2013

= Dunama jessiebarronae =

Species of moth

Dunama jessiebarronae is a moth in the family Notodontidae. It is found in Costa Rica, where it is only known from the eastern slopes of the Cordillera Volcanica de Guanacaste, Cordillera Volcanica Central, Cordillera de Talamanca, llanuras de Sarapiqui, and the lowlands of the Caribbean, at elevations ranging from 50 to 1,115 meters.

== Description ==
The length of the forewings is 13.5–13.7 mm. The forewing dorsal ground color is cream at the base and 2/3 black brown. There is a prominent black-brown, slightly oblique bar between the base of the reniform spot and the base of the inner margin of the forewing in both sexes. The veins are lined with gray, especially distally. The anal fold and cubitus are blackish brown and the orbicular spot is diffuse and blackish brown. The reniform spot is small and blackish brown. The ventral surfaces of both wings are gray brown. The forewing costal margin is cream ventrally. The dorsal hindwing is dirty gray brown, but lighter near the base.

== Biology ==
The larvae feed on Heliconia irrasa, Heliconia latispatha, Heliconia pogonantha and the introduced Musa acuminata.

== Etymology ==
The species is named in honor of Ms. Jessie Barron, great-great-grandmother of Jessie Hill of Philadelphia and Hawaii, in recognition of Jessie Hill's contribution to saving and inventorying the conserved ACG rain forest in which Dunama jessiebarronae breeds.

== Gallery ==
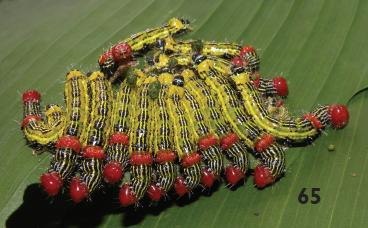
Larvae - penultimate instar

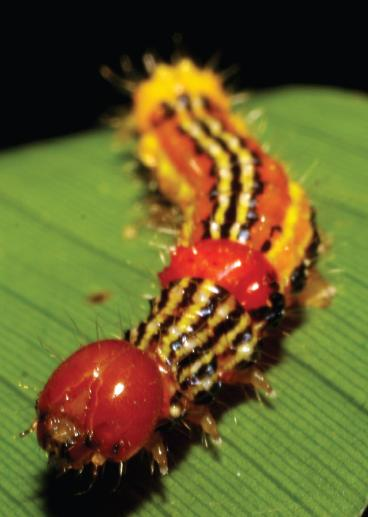
Larvae - last instar

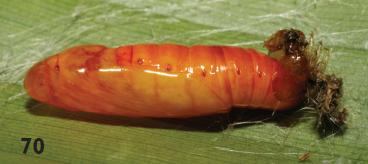
Pupa
