= Tithraustes moerens =

Scientific classification
- Kingdom: Animalia
- Phylum: Arthropoda
- Clade: Pancrustacea
- Class: Insecta
- Order: Lepidoptera
- Superfamily: Noctuoidea
- Family: Notodontidae
- Genus: Tithraustes
- Species: T. moerens

Binomial name
- Tithraustes moerens Warren, 1900

Synonyms
- Tithraustes condensata Warren, 1900

Species of moth

Tithraustes moerens is a moth of the family Notodontidae. It is found in the forest understory along forest trails and streambeds in the Andean foothills of western Ecuador, reaching southern Colombia.

Larvae have been recorded feeding on an unidentified understory palm.
