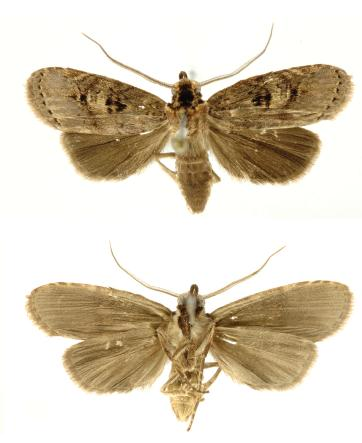
- Male
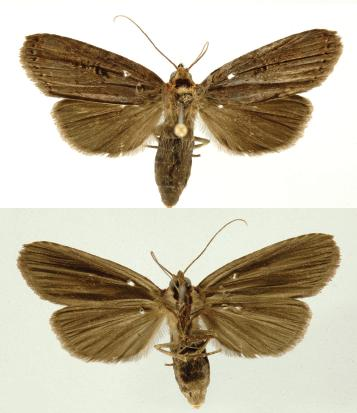
- Female

Scientific classification
- Kingdom: Animalia
- Phylum: Arthropoda
- Class: Insecta
- Order: Lepidoptera
- Superfamily: Noctuoidea
- Family: Notodontidae
- Genus: Dunama
- Species: D. janewaldronae

Binomial name
- Dunama janewaldronae Chacón, 2013

= Dunama janewaldronae =

Species of moth

Dunama janewaldronae is a moth in the family Notodontidae. It is found in Costa Rica, where it is known from the eastern side of the Cordillera Volcanica de Guanacaste at elevations ranging from 400 to 680 meters.

== Description ==
The length of the forewings is 12.5–13.4 mm. The forewing dorsal ground color is a mixture of gray-brown and beige scales. The veins are lined with gray, especially distally. The anal fold and cubitus are blackish brown and the orbicular spot is diffuse blackish brown. The reniform spot is small and blackish brown. The ventral surfaces of both wings are gray brown. The dorsal hindwing is dirty gray brown, but lighter near base.

== Biology ==
The larvae feed on Chamaedorea dammeriana, Geonoma congesta, Geonoma cuneata, Prestoea decurrens and Welfia regia.

== Etymology ==
The species is named in honor of Ms. Jane Waldron, great-grandmother of Jessie Hill of Philadelphia and Hawaii, in recognition of Jessie Hill's contribution to saving and inventorying the conserved ACG rain forest in which Dunama janewaldronae breeds.

== Gallery ==
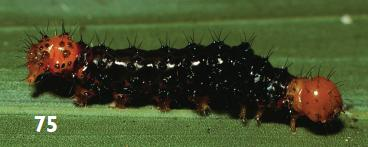
Larvae - last instar

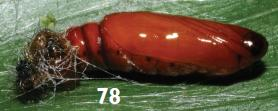
Pupa
