= Tithraustes lambertae =

Scientific classification
- Kingdom: Animalia
- Phylum: Arthropoda
- Clade: Pancrustacea
- Class: Insecta
- Order: Lepidoptera
- Superfamily: Noctuoidea
- Family: Notodontidae
- Genus: Tithraustes
- Species: T. lambertae

Binomial name
- Tithraustes lambertae Miller, 2008

Species of moth

Tithraustes lambertae is a moth of the family Notodontidae. It occurs in wet forests on the Caribbean slope in Costa Rica.

The length of the forewings is 16–17.5 mm for males and 16.5–18 mm for females.

Larvae have been recorded feeding on six species of palm: Asterogyne martiana, Calyptrogyne trichostachys, Geonoma congesta, Geonoma cuneata, Prestoea decurrens and Welfia regia.
