= Dunama tuna =

Scientific classification
- Domain: Eukaryota
- Kingdom: Animalia
- Phylum: Arthropoda
- Class: Insecta
- Order: Lepidoptera
- Superfamily: Noctuoidea
- Family: Notodontidae
- Genus: Dunama
- Species: D. tuna

Binomial name
- Dunama tuna (Schaus, 1901)

Synonyms
- Heterocampa tuna Schaus, 1901; Disphragis tuna; Naduna sagittula Dognin, 1914; Dunama sagittula

Species of moth

Dunama tuna is a moth in the family Notodontidae. It is found in Colombia.

The length of the forewings is 12–19 mm for males and about 22 mm for females.
