= Tithraustes (moth) =

Scientific classification
- Kingdom: Animalia
- Phylum: Arthropoda
- Clade: Pancrustacea
- Class: Insecta
- Order: Lepidoptera
- Superfamily: Noctuoidea
- Family: Notodontidae
- Tribe: Dioptini
- Genus: Tithraustes; H. Druce, 1885

Genus of moths

Tithraustes is a genus of moths of the family Notodontidae described by Herbert Druce in 1885.

== Selected species ==
- Tithraustes albinigra Warren, 1905
- Tithraustes caliginosa (Dognin, 1902)
- Tithraustes deiphon H. Druce, 1885
- Tithraustes esernius (H. Druce, 1885)
- Tithraustes haemon H. Druce, 1885
- Tithraustes lambertae Miller, 2008
- Tithraustes moerens Warren, 1900
- Tithraustes noctiluces (Butler, 1872)
- Tithraustes pyrifera Dognin, 1911
- Tithraustes quinquepunctata Warren, 1901
- Tithraustes seminigrata Warren, 1901
- Tithraustes snyderi Miller, 2008
