= William Seifriz =

Professor of Biology at University of Pennsylvania

- Born: August 11, 1888; Washington D.C., United States
- Died: July 13, 1955 (aged 66)
- Education: Johns Hopkins University, B.S honoris causa 1917; Ph.D. in Botany 1920
- Known for: Protoplasmatology, Biorheology, Cytoplasmic Streaming, Spiraling Habit of Plants
- Awards: Seesel Fellow (1922–1923); National Research Fellow (1924)
- Scientific career
- Fields: Biophysics, Plant Physiology, Rheology, Colloid Chemistry
- Workplaces: Yale University, University of Michigan, University of Pennsylvania
- Notable students: Janet Plowe

William Seifriz (August 11, 1888 – July 13, 1955) was a professor of biology at the University of Pennsylvania and an important figure in the history of plant physiology and plant cell biology.

== Personal life ==
Seifriz was born on August 11, 1888, outside of Washington, D.C. to Paul Seifriz M.D. and his wife, both of whom emigrated from Germany in 1887. After Paul Seifriz died, Seifriz' mother ran a boarding house for scientists from the United States Department of Agriculture. This association with botanists led the young Seifriz to pursue the study of botany. After graduating McKinley Technical High School in 1907 as valedictorian, he worked as a laboratory assistant in the United States Department of Agriculture, working on experimental electroculture. After working as a laboratory assistant for three years, he spent one year as a practical student in a shipyard in Bremen, Germany. After returning to America, he spent one year studying law at Georgetown University. Realizing that science would be a worthwhile way for him to accomplish his life's work, he entered Johns Hopkins University where he was awarded a B.S. honoris causa in 1917 and earned a Ph.D. in botany in 1920. After graduation, Seifriz went to Geneva, Switzerland to study cell physiology with Robert Hippolyte Chodat. He continued to do research at Imperial College London and King's College London in England. Then Seifriz joined Herbert Freundlich at the Kaiser Wilhelm Institute to learn the techniques he would need to understand the physical properties of protoplasm.

Seifriz spent time with Ernest Rutherford, Jacobus van't Hoff, Svante Arrhenius, Niels Bohr, Max Planck, Walther Nernst and Max von Laue.

In 1932 when he was head of the University of Pennsylvania botanical laboratories, he led an expedition to the Sierra Nevada de Santa Marta mountains in Colombia to collect and study flora there.

Seifriz held 'Philosophical Meetings' at his home Seifriziana to which he invited artists, musicians, scientists, medical doctors, psychologists, and other intellectuals. He loved animals and kept birds, monkeys, donkeys, cats, rabbits, peacocks and a dog. He also collected French porcelain and Italian bronze. He did not have a telephone.

Seifriz married Myra George when he was 64.

Seifriz died on July 13, 1955, while collecting botanical specimens near the Chesapeake Bay.

William Seifriz was an Associate Editor for the journal Protoplasma from its founding in 1926 to his death in 1955. He was also an Associate Editor of Journal of Colloid Science and Biodynamica.

== University life ==
Seifriz was a Seessel Fellow at Yale University from 1922 to 1923. He became an instructor at the University of Michigan in 1923 and came to the University of Pennsylvania as a National Research Fellow in 1924 and became a professor of protoplasmatology and plant geography in 1925.

== Research ==
Seifriz was a naturalist and a laboratory scientist who studied the viscoelastic properties and microscopic structure of protoplasm. Using a micromanipulator and microdissection, Seifriz showed that protoplasm was non-Newtonian, thixotropic and elastic. Seifriz proposed that the physical properties of protoplasm were a consequence of long chain molecules attached to one another like a brush heap. Seifriz studied the streaming protoplasm of the slime mold Physarum polycephalum and coined the word, protoplasmatologist for someone who studies the properties of living protoplasm. Seifriz' expertise ranged from physics to philosophy. Seifriz's work appeared in Time Magazine.

In a review of Seifriz' book, Protoplasm, E. O. Kraemer wrote, "Professor Seifriz is a versatile scientist. His work on emulsions, gels, and other colloid topics is well known among chemists and physicists, but they may not be aware that Professor Seifriz is a member of a botany department and is an active investigator in botany and biology. Professor Seifriz's general attitude toward science, and, in particular, his point of view in his book is typified by the quotation from Descartes with which he introduces his preface: If, therefore, anyone wishes to search out the truth of things in serious earnest, he ought not to select one special science; for all the sciences are conjoined with each other and interdependent."

In a review of Seifriz' book, The Structure of Protoplasm, C. A. Shull described it as "One of the most important summaries of protoplasmic structure in the English language."

Noburô Kamiya worked with Seifriz, According to Time Magazine, "Unobtrusively last year into Dr. Seifriz' laboratory glided a fragile, gracious, 27-year-old Japanese scientist, Noburo Kamiya. This gifted young man had done postgraduate work in botany at Tokyo's Imperial University, was studying at Giessen in Germany in the fateful summer of 1939. When Germany invaded Poland, the Japanese Government ordered Kamiya to get out. Not stopping for books or clothing, he left posthaste for the U. S. by way of Hamburg and Bergen. He wrote to Dr. Seifriz, asking if he could go to work in his laboratory. Seifriz welcomed him. "First thing I did," Seifriz recalls, "was to lend him a raincoat." Kamiya still has it".

== Teaching ==
In his lectures in Physics and Chemistry of Protoplasm, Seifriz gave not only the facts, but the background of the subject and the lines of thought by which the discoveries have come about. When he lectured on Plants and Climates, he showed slides of photographs that he took while on his many botanical trips throughout the world.

== Books ==
- Seifriz, William (1936) Protoplasm. McGraw-Hill Book Company, New York, NY
- Seifriz, William (1938) The Physiology of Plants. John Wiley & Sons, New York, NY
- Seifriz, William, ed. (1942) A Symposium on the Structure of Protoplasm: A Monograph of the American Society of Plant Physiologists. Iowa State College Press, Ames IA

== Film ==
Seifriz used cinematography to make a movie entitled, Seifriz on Protoplasm, which won prizes at several film festivals and was shown on television.

== Honors ==
Chamaedorea seifrizii, the Victorian Parlor Palm, was named after William Seifriz.

== Obituaries ==
- Kamiya, Noburô (1956). "In Memoriam William Seifriz". Protoplasma. 45 (4): 513–524. doi:10.1007/bf01252673. S2CID 34771303.
