= Dunama ravistriata =

Scientific classification
- Domain: Eukaryota
- Kingdom: Animalia
- Phylum: Arthropoda
- Class: Insecta
- Order: Lepidoptera
- Superfamily: Noctuoidea
- Family: Notodontidae
- Genus: Dunama
- Species: D. ravistriata

Binomial name
- Dunama ravistriata Todd, 1976

Species of moth

Dunama ravistriata is a moth in the family Notodontidae. It is found in French Guiana and Brazil.

The length of the forewings is 14–15 mm for males and 14–17 mm for females.
