= Fiambre =

Traditional Guatemalan dish

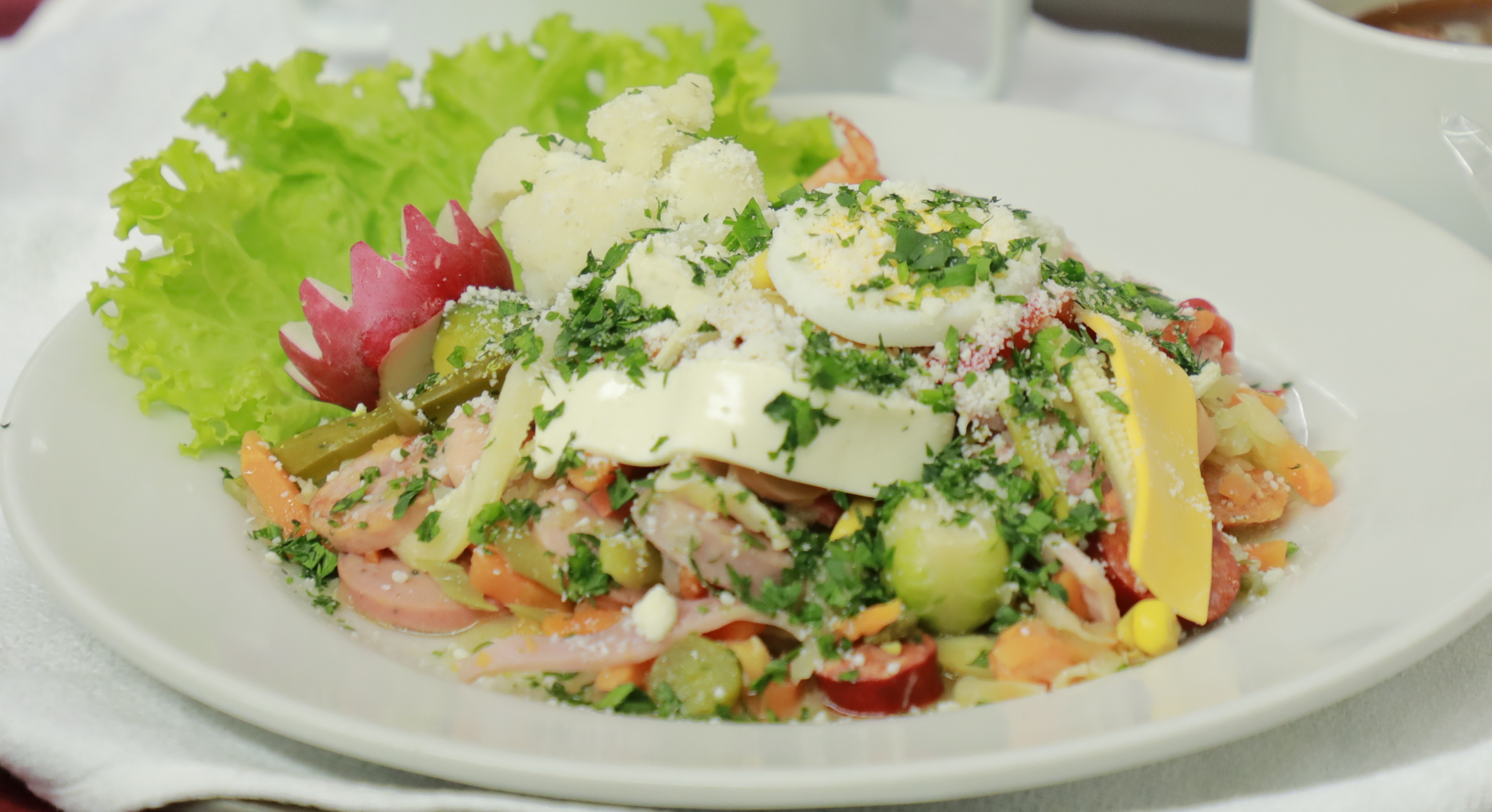
- Type: Salad
- Place of origin: Guatemala

Fiambre is a traditional Guatemalan salad that is prepared and eaten yearly to celebrate All Saints Day (Spanish: Día de Todos los Santos), November 1, and All Souls' Day (Spanish: Día de Todos los Fieles Difuntos), November 2. These days are also known as the Day of the Dead (Spanish: Día de los Muertos) especially in Mexico. Fiambre is served chilled and may be made with dozens of ingredients. it is also eaten on the western departments of El Salvador.

== History ==
Fiambre started out from the tradition in Guatemala of taking dead family members their favorite dishes to the cemeteries for the Day of the Dead. As all different families brought food to the celebrations, they became mixed, eventually mixing them together to this all-encompassing salad. Ingredients usually include numerous sausages and cold cuts, pickled baby corn and onion, beets, pacaya flower, different cheeses, olives, chicken, and sometimes even Brussels sprouts.

This dish varies from family to family, recipes traditionally passed on to younger generations. Because of this, on the Day of the Dead, it is customary to share fiambre with other families and relatives.

== Variants ==
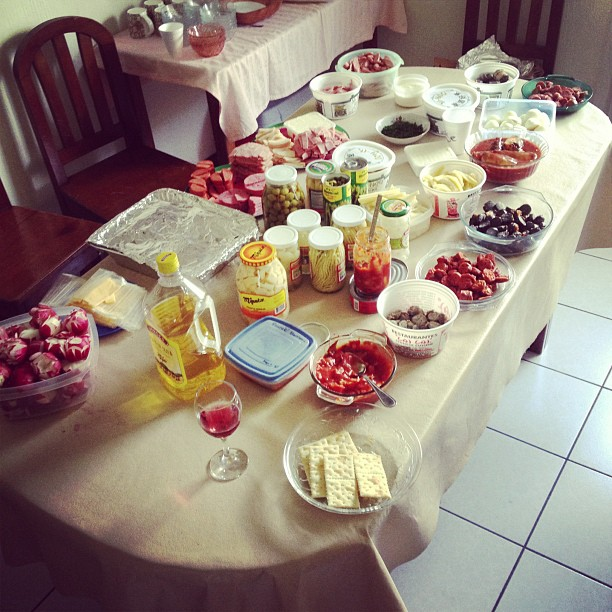
Table with fiambre ingredients before final preparation

Some variants are:

- Fiambre from Antigua
- Fiambre rojo (with beets)
- Fiambre blanco (no beets)
- Fiambre desarmado (traditional of the department of Jalapa)
- Fiambre verde (no cold cuts, vegetarian)
