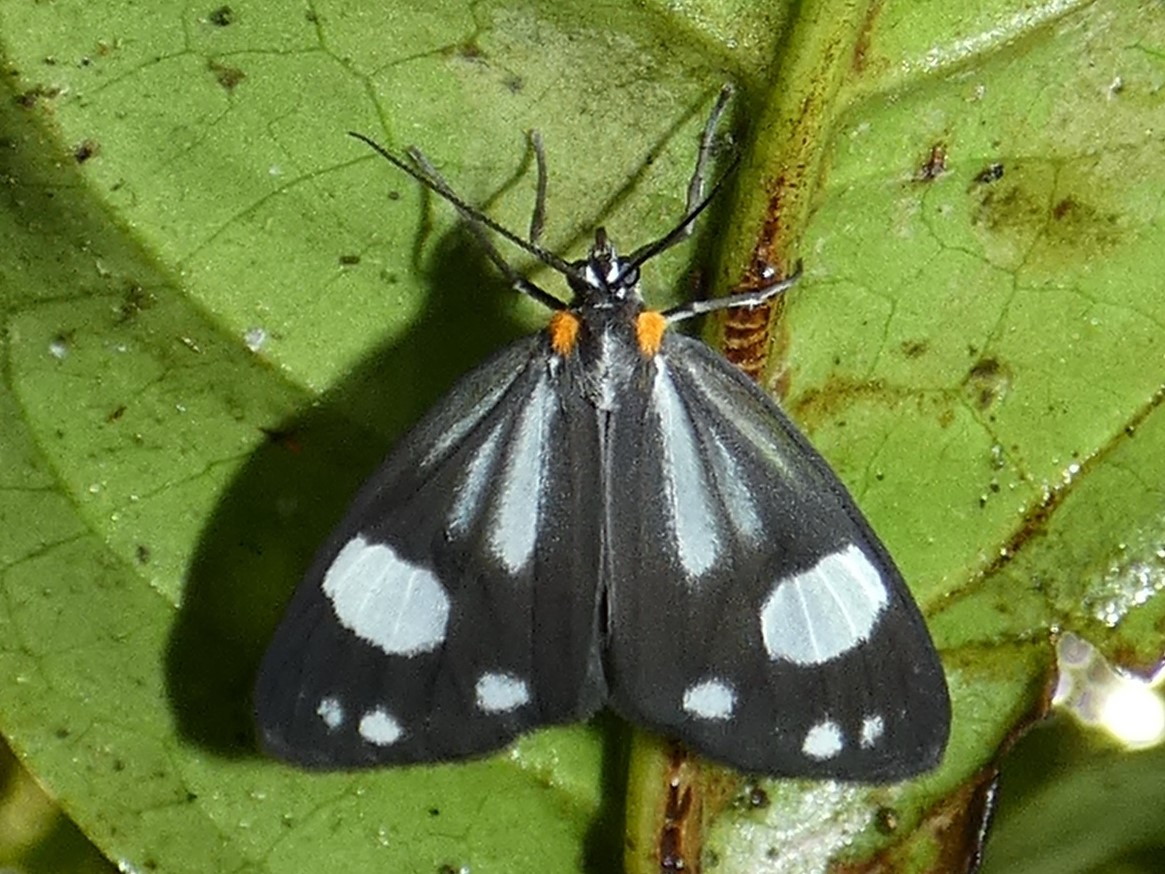

Scientific classification
- Kingdom: Animalia
- Phylum: Arthropoda
- Clade: Pancrustacea
- Class: Insecta
- Order: Lepidoptera
- Superfamily: Noctuoidea
- Family: Notodontidae
- Genus: Tithraustes
- Species: T. seminigrata

Binomial name
- Tithraustes seminigrata Warren, 1901

= Tithraustes seminigrata =

Species of moth

Tithraustes seminigrata is a species of moth in the family Notodontidae. It is found in Panama.

Larvae have been reared on an unidentified species of palm in the genus Calyptrogyne.
