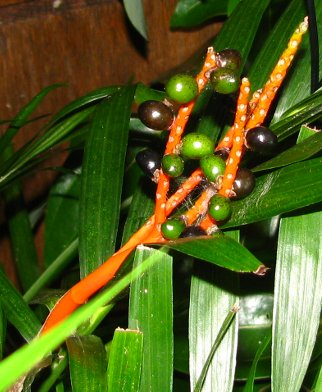

Conservation status
- Least Concern (IUCN 3.1)

Scientific classification
- Kingdom: Plantae
- Clade: Tracheophytes
- Clade: Angiosperms
- Clade: Monocots
- Clade: Commelinids
- Order: Arecales
- Family: Arecaceae
- Genus: Chamaedorea
- Species: C. cataractarum

Binomial name
- Chamaedorea cataractarum Mart.

= Chamaedorea cataractarum =

Species of palm

Chamaedorea cataractarum, the cat palm, cascade palm, or cataract palm, is a small palm tree. It is native to Southern Mexico and Central America.

== Description ==
Chamaedorea cataractarum grows to 1 metre (3.3 ft) tall indoors and 2 m (6.6 ft) outdoors, with slender, green, cane-like leaf stems and pinnate leaves. This palm reproduces sexually via seed as well as asexually when new plants sprout from the base of older plants. Flower stalks are either male or female, but both occur in the same group of plants. After releasing pollen, male stalks wither. If female flowers are pollinated, the stalks turn a bright orange color as the seeds mature. A small, attractive, trunkless, clumping palm, it grows to about 2 m (6.6 ft) high, and 2.5 m (8.2 ft) across, with glossy, dark green leaves, and long thin leaflets. It will eventually form quite a large dense, clump given time. (It is occasionally used as a hedge plant.) This trunkless habit, along with its flexible long thin leaflets is an adaption that allows as little resistance as possible to flowing water, helping to prevent it from being washed away during floods. As the trunk grows, it creeps across the ground helping to anchor the plant even more securely against the forces of water.

Immature fruit is ovoid, shiny and dark green. Fruit remains sessile on the flower stalk. It turns black when mature and measures about 1.25 centimetres (0.49 in) through the long axis, 1 cm (0.39 in) in diameter.

== Cultivation ==
Cat palms require high light for indoor house plants. The suggested minimum temperature is 4.5 °C (40.1 °F). They are particularly susceptible to dry soil, and water must be applied regularly. Fertilizer should be applied every one or two months.

It is grown as a garden plant in tropical and subtropical regions and climates.
