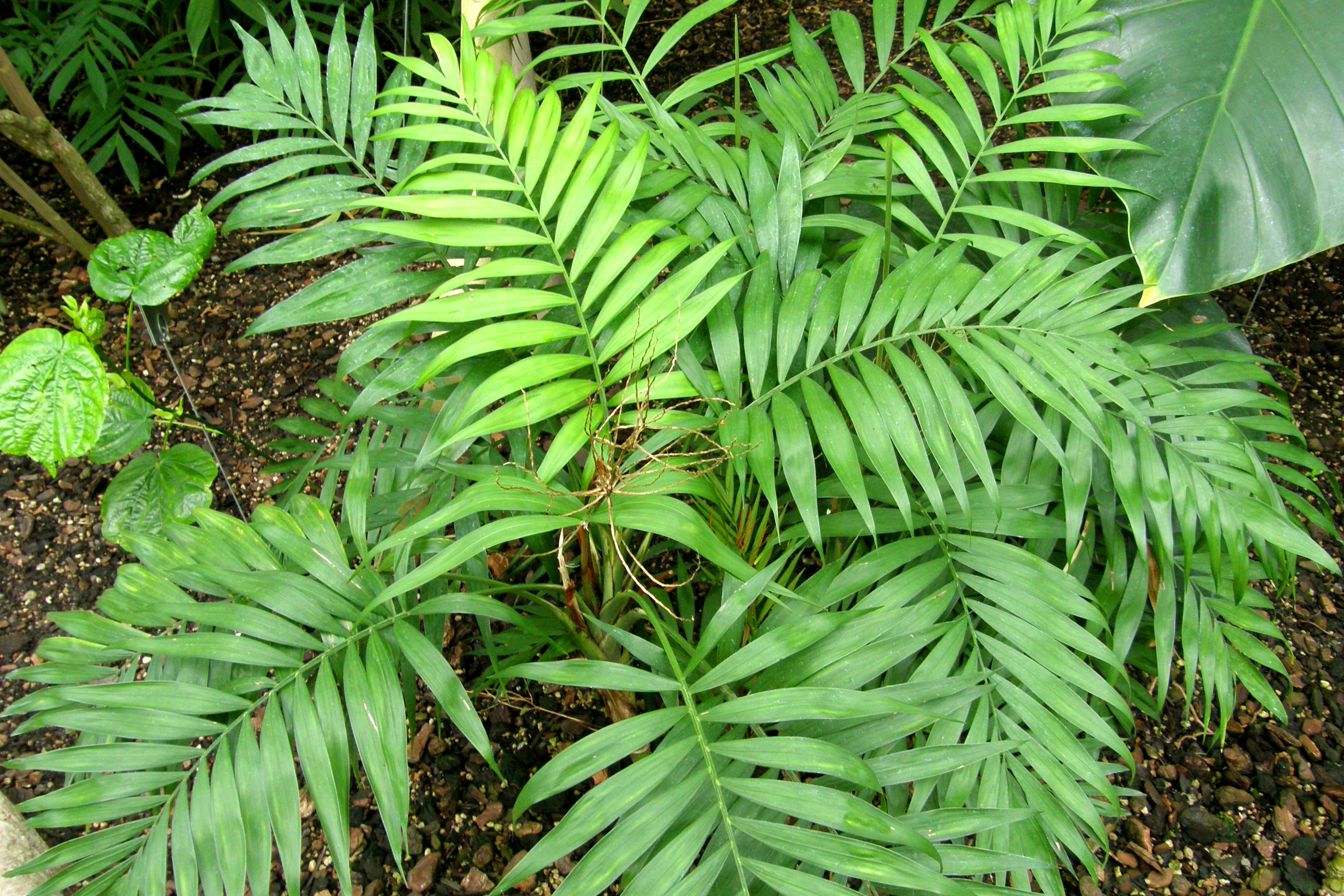
- C. elegans (parlour palm) in Berlin

Scientific classification
- Kingdom: Plantae
- Clade: Tracheophytes
- Clade: Angiosperms
- Clade: Monocots
- Clade: Commelinids
- Order: Arecales
- Family: Arecaceae
- Genus: Chamaedorea
- Species: C. elegans

Binomial name
- Chamaedorea elegans Mart., 1830

Subspecies
- C. elegans var. elegans; C. elegans var. angustifolia M. Martens & Galeotti

Synonyms
- Collinia elegans (Mart.) Liebm. ex Oerst.; Collinia elegans var. angustifolia (M. Martens & Galeotti) M. Martens & Galeotti; Neanthe bella O.F.Cook; Nunnezharia elegans (Mart.) Kuntze, 1891; Neanthe elegans (Mart.) O.F.Cook, 1937

= Chamaedorea elegans =

Species of palm

Chamaedorea elegans, the neanthe bella palm or parlour palm, is a species of small palm tree native to the rainforests in Southern Mexico and Guatemala. The parlor palm is one of the most extensively sold houseplant palms in the world. It is one of several species with leaves that are harvested as xate.

This plant has gained the Royal Horticultural Society's Award of Garden Merit.

== Description ==
A woody, rhizomatous plant with a slender green trunk, it is found in tropical areas and grows to 2–3 m (6 ft 7 in – 9 ft 10 in) tall (rarely to 4–5 m (13–16 ft)). It has 1.2 centimetres (1/2 in)-long ringed stigma, punctured crescent-shaped leaves, erect buds, and flexible tubular stems without spines with generally pinnate foliage. The crown carries 3-10 long-leaf pinnate leaves (more when mature). A remarkable feature of this species is the early age of the onset of flowering, with some plants blooming with a height of only 30 centimetres (12 in).

The small, light yellow, yellow, or orange-red odorous flowers appear on irregularly branched peduncles that grow below or among the leaf. They emerge from the trunk as lateral buds and open in the form of clusters of small balls without petals. These have a certain resemblance to those of the mimosa. Occasionally, pea-sized berries develop after flowering, which are 6mm in diameter, and dark, collected in paniculate inflorescences.

== Cultivation ==
It is often cultivated in temperate regions as a houseplant and in gardens in Southeastern United States, where it grows to 2 m (6 ft 7 in) tall with very slow growth. It is most-often planted and sold in batches of 5-30 seedlings. Over time, a few emergent plants begin to dominate as the weaker/smaller seedlings are crowded out for light and eventually die, leaving within a few years of purchase a few survivors which develop stems and can live for many decades in a pot. It tolerates low levels of humidity and light, though it prefers medium to high humidity and bright indirect light. Chamaedorea elegans is intolerant of frost and must be kept indoors in winter in non-tropical climates.

It enjoys light potting soil, good humidity and moderate lighting without direct sunlight, but it accommodates a certain dryness, high humidity or reduced lighting. In winter, it is preferable that the temperature of the room it's housed in does not exceed 12–14 °C (53 1/2–57 °F). The plant was successful in the Victorian era because it survived in the dark and often unheated British homes of the time, and in greenhouses which were used to grow and cultivate exotic plants, a practice fashionable at the time.

Propagation is done only by sowing.

In its natural rain-forest floor setting, the parlor palm often grows in competition with vines. It sometimes is seen growing along rock walls, which can provide support. Due to the thinness of the stem, in nature the palm sometimes falls over during storms if grown in the open. The rhizomatous roots can re-root from a fallen position in mature plants, if it has grown adventitious roots.

In a potted environment, plants can be pruned with caution; older, lower leaves can be pruned at the base of the leaf stem, but cutting off the growing point (known as the apical meristem or heart) where the new leaves emerge at the top of the stem is fatal.

In mature plants, single stems can be cut off at the base if adventitious roots are available. As the stem grows additional roots, the bottom of the stem can be severed and the plant re-rooted from the roots higher up the stem.

=== Varieties ===
There are believed to be at least two naturally occurring sub-species of Chamedorea elegans: one has a thinner stem and tends to grow at lower elevations, while the highland variety tends to have a thicker stem. There are also a few cultivars with distinguishing characteristics, such as a 'dark-leaved' cultivar. These are rare and the vast majority sold in stores are the standard bright green.

== Distribution ==
In the wild, it is found in Belize, Gulf of Mexico, and Mexico in the states of Chiapas, Campeche, Guerrero, Hidalgo, Oaxaca, Puebla, Quintana Roo, San Luis Potosí, Tabasco, Veracruz and Yucatan.

In Guatemala, it is found in Huehuetenango, Alta Verapaz, and Petén Department.

== Gallery ==
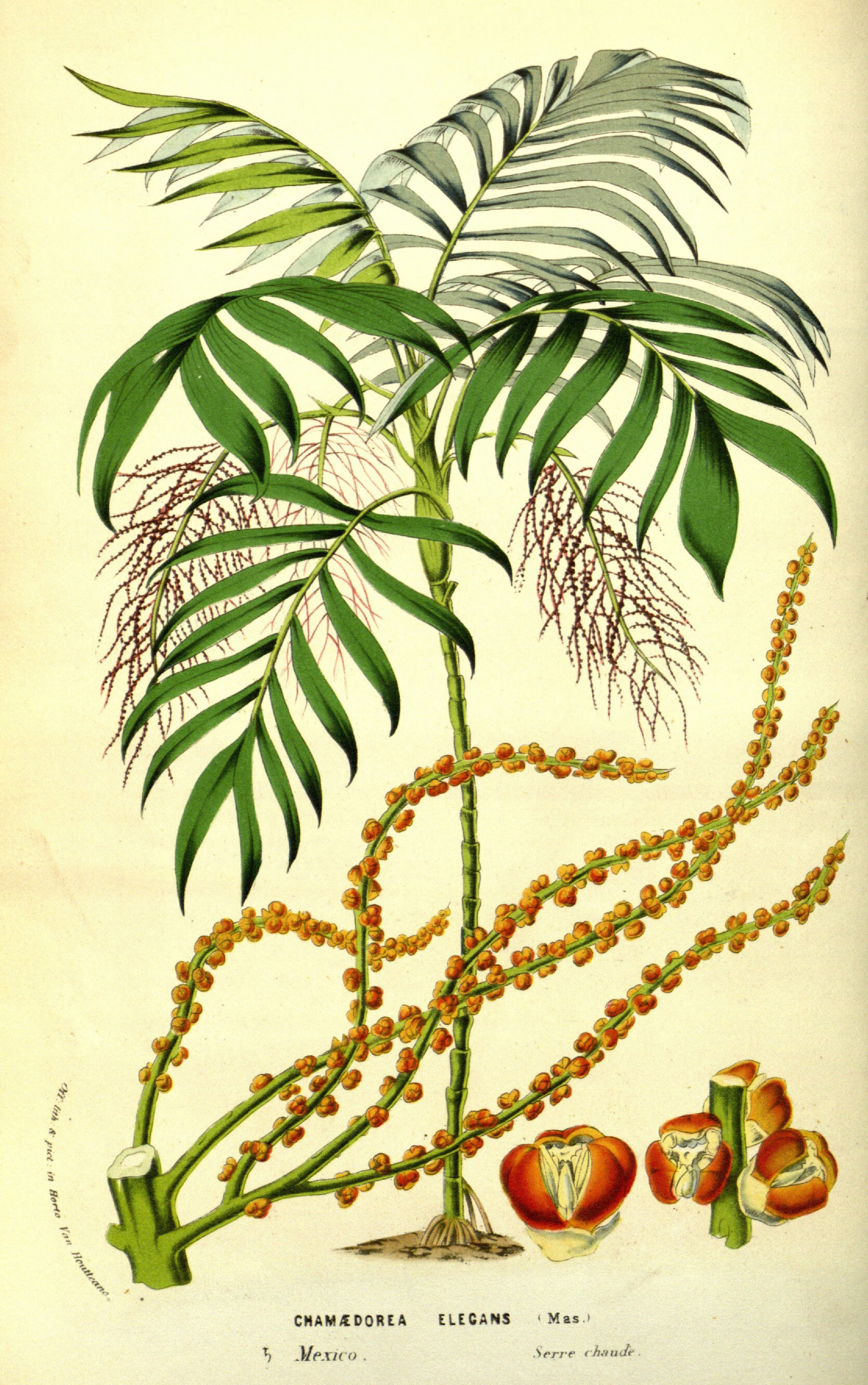
Botanical illustration

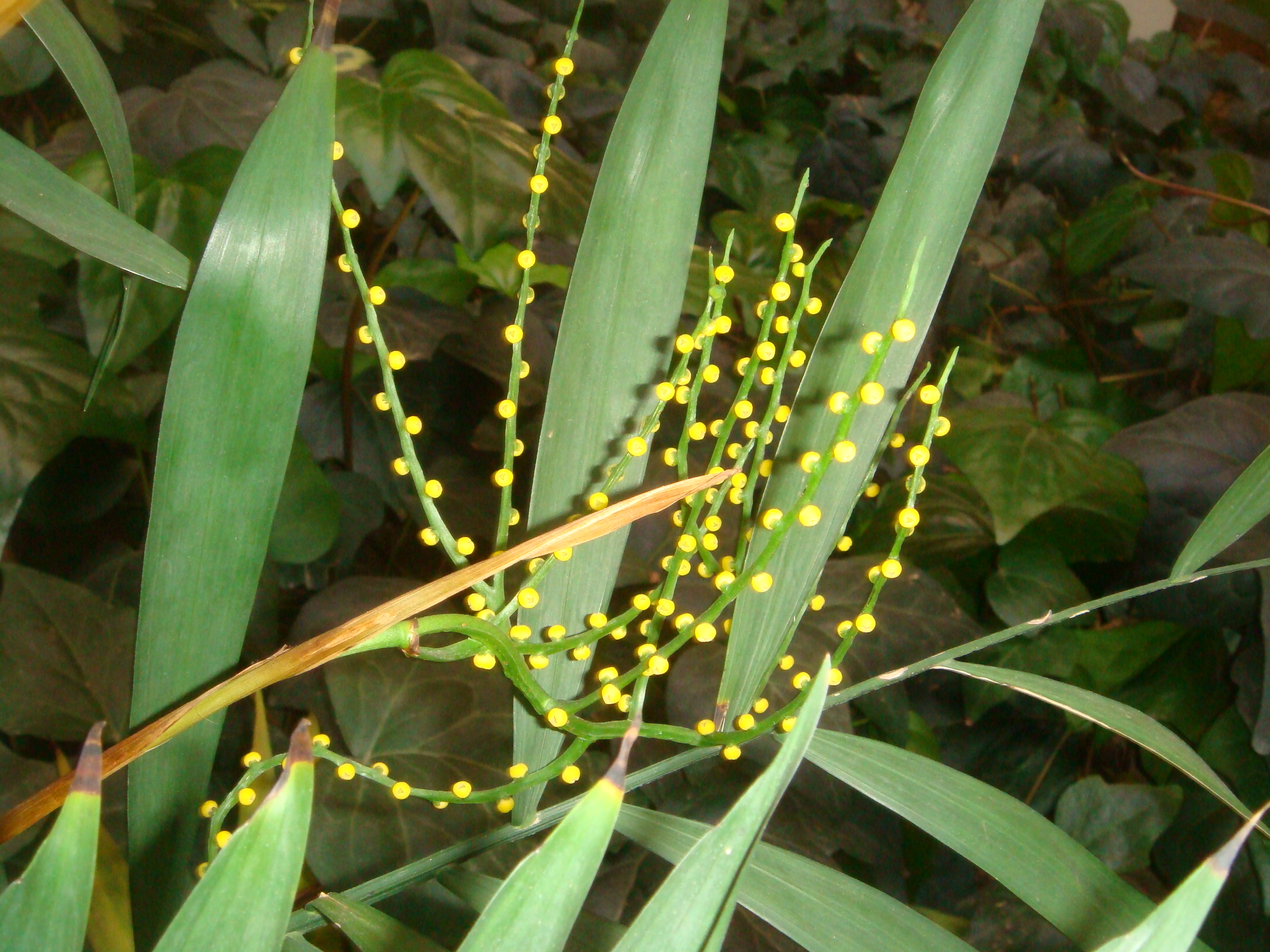
Unripe fruits

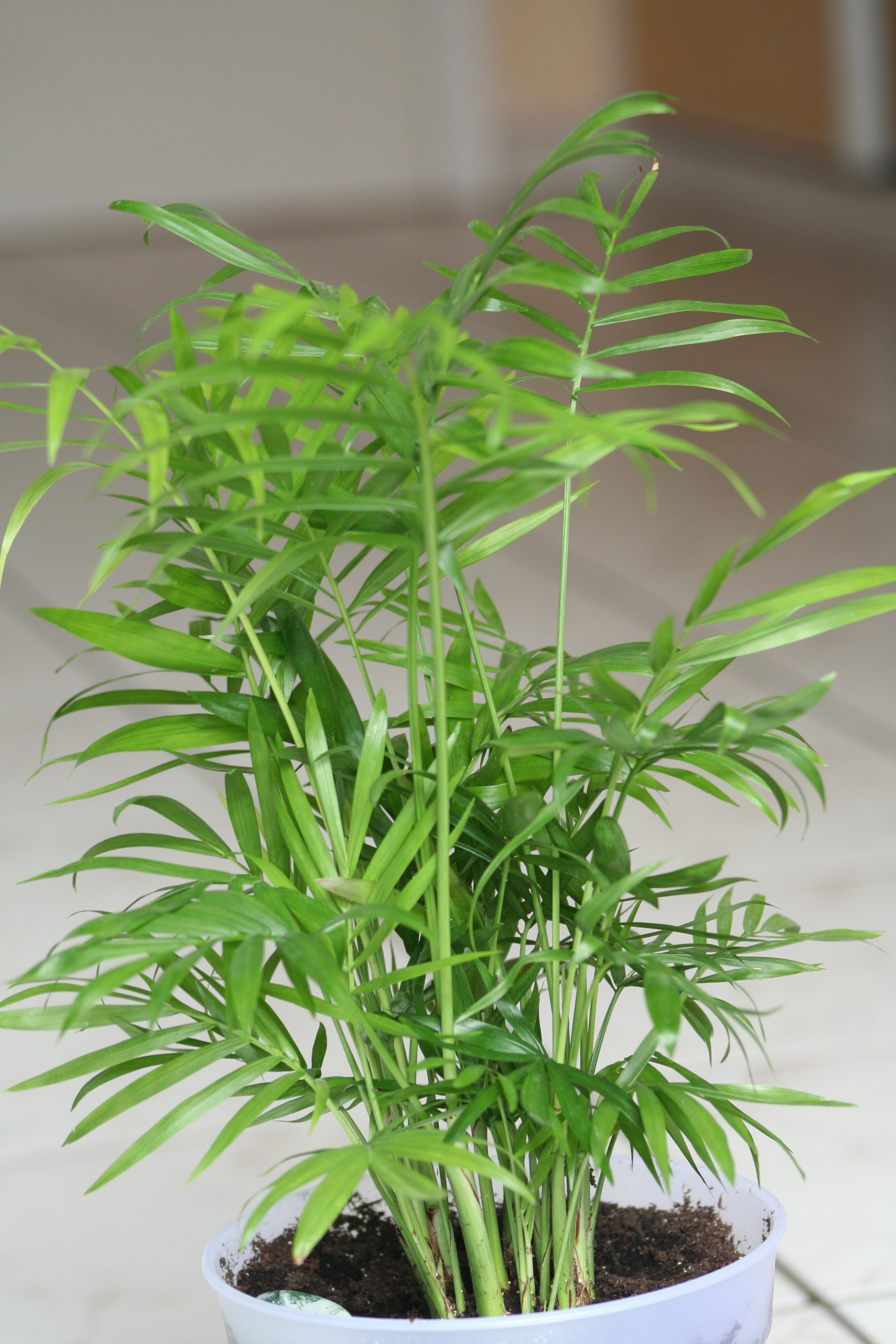
As a houseplant

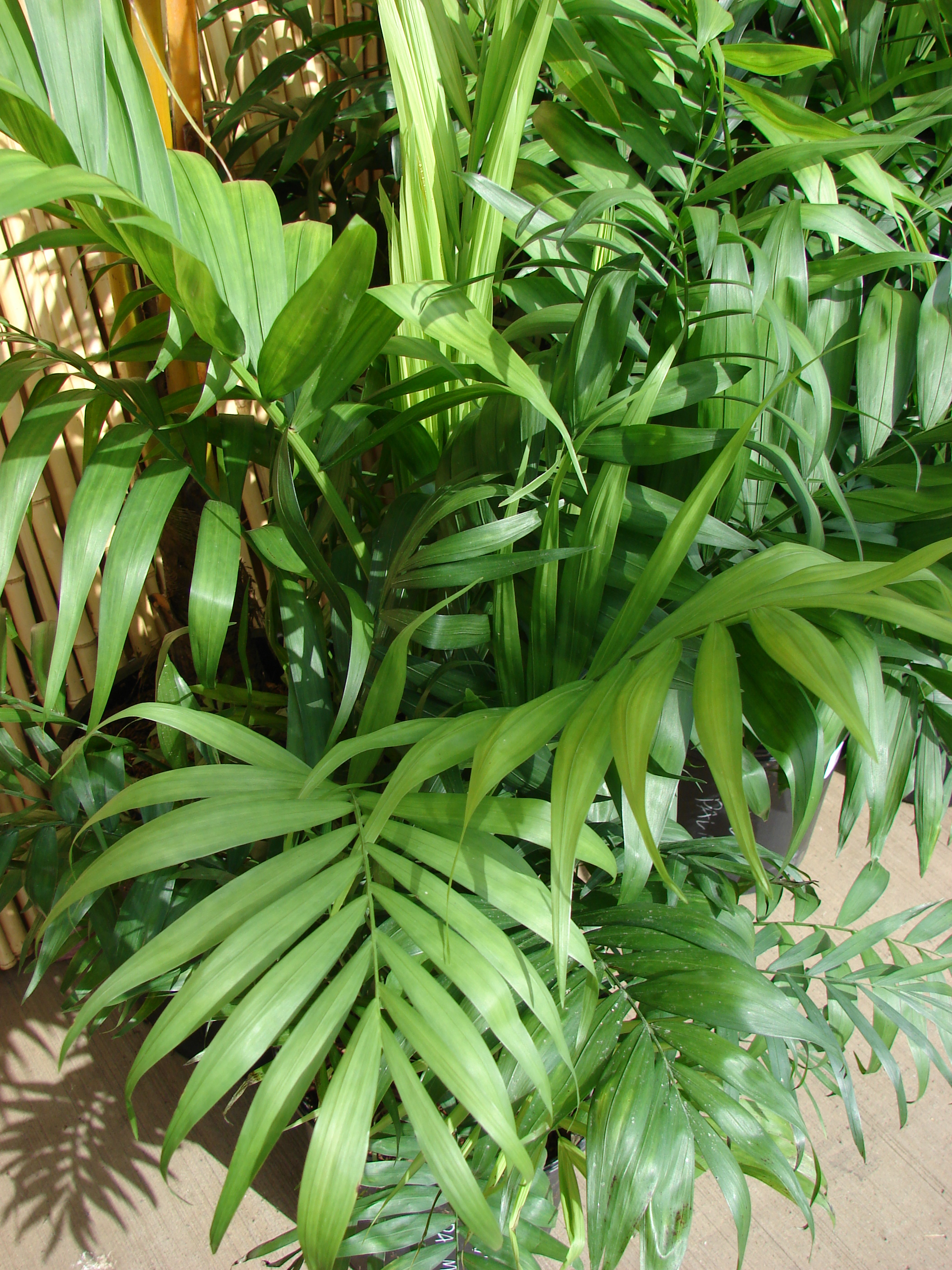
Mature plant foliage

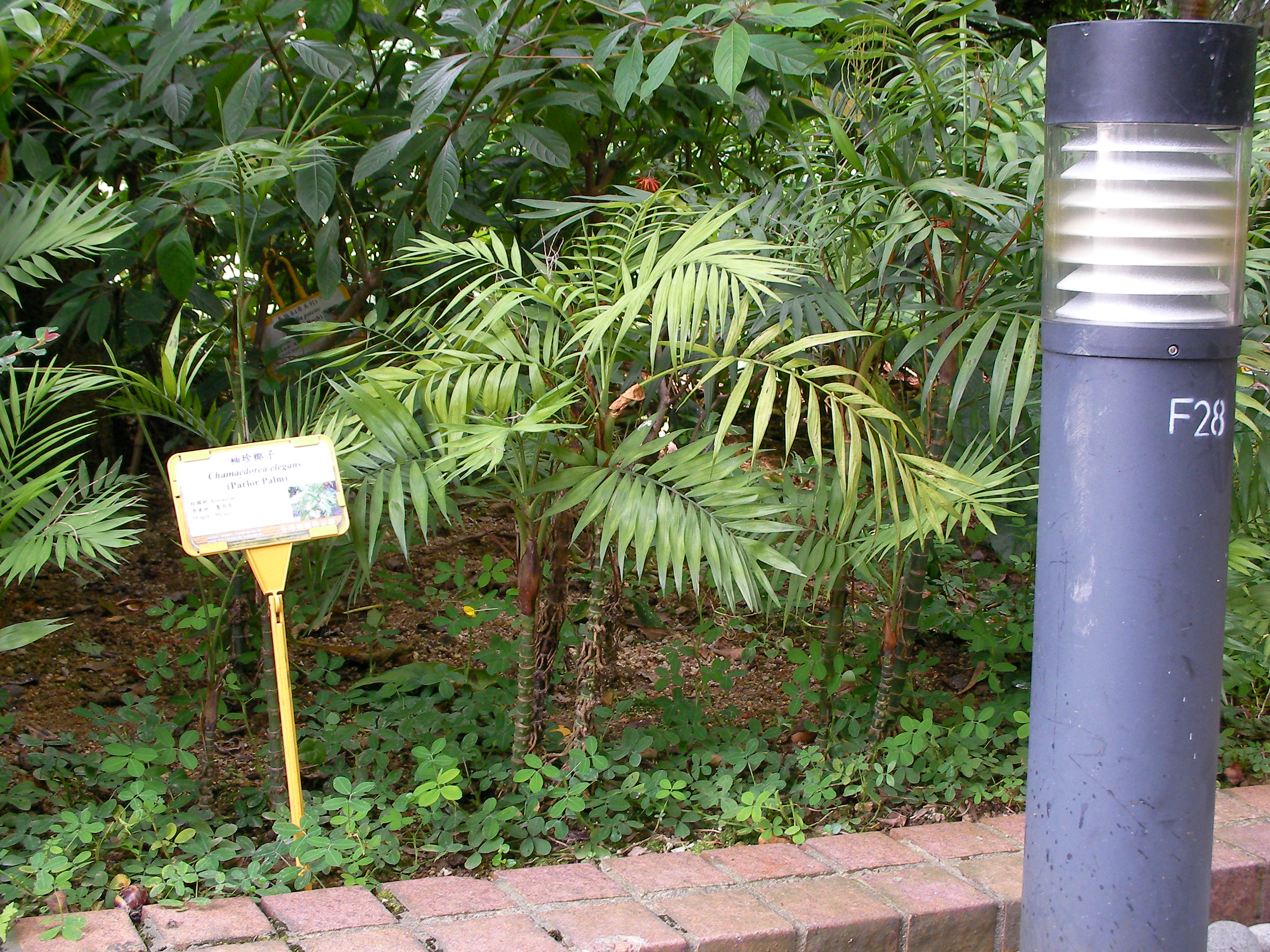
A specimen at Hong Kong Zoological and Botanical Gardens
