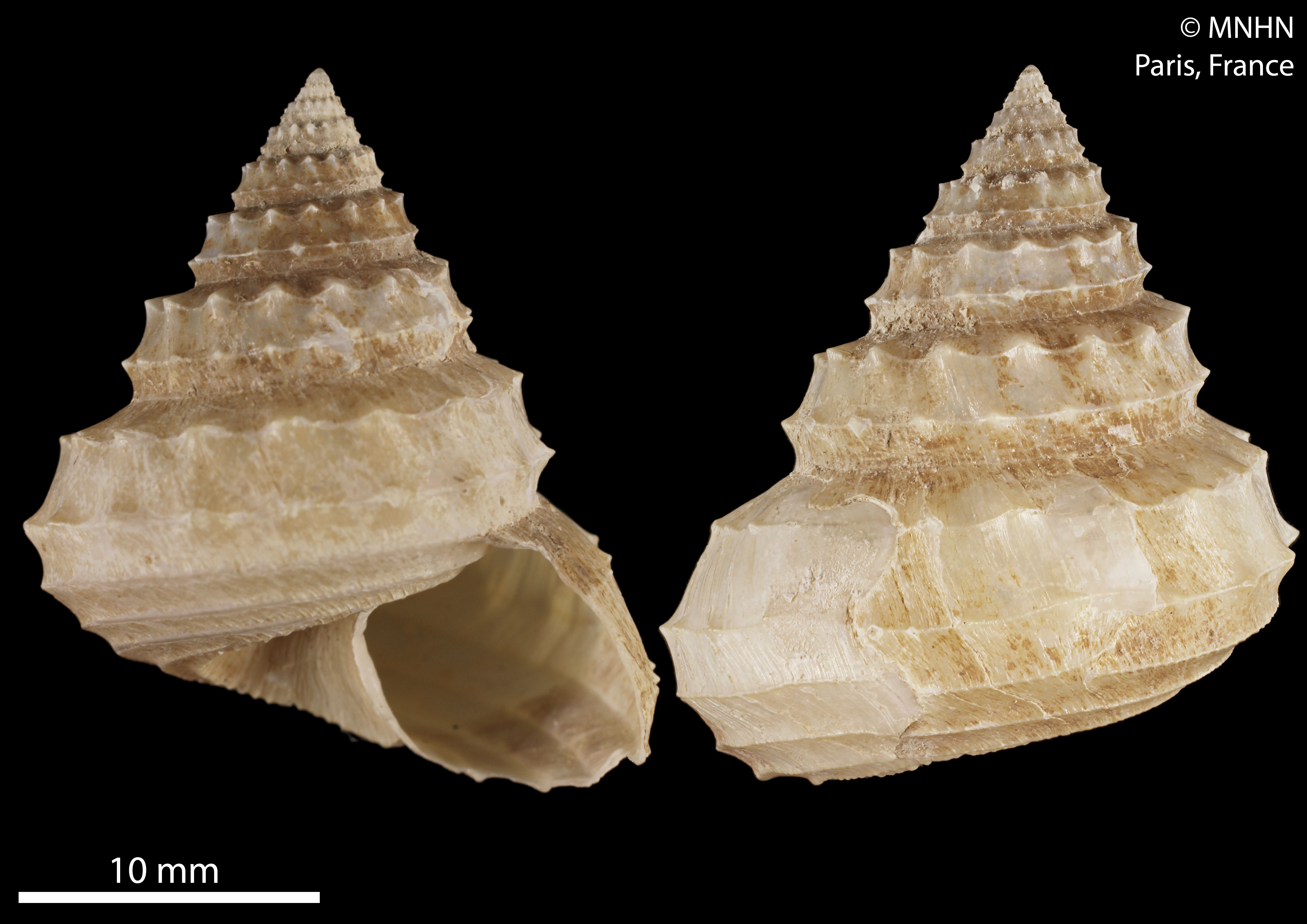
- Shell of Calliotropis metallica (specimen at MNHN, Paris)

Scientific classification
- Kingdom: Animalia
- Phylum: Mollusca
- Class: Gastropoda
- Subclass: Vetigastropoda
- Family: Calliotropidae
- Genus: Calliotropis
- Species: C. metallica

Binomial name
- Calliotropis metallica (Wood-Mason & Alcock, 1891)

Synonyms
- Solariellopsis metallica Wood-Mason & Alcock, 1891 (original combination)

= Calliotropis metallica =

Species of gastropod

Calliotropis metallica is a species of sea snail, a marine gastropod mollusk in the family Eucyclidae.

== Description ==
(Original description) A brilliantly nacreous species, ornamented with two spiral rows of conical tubercles and four smooth carinae on the base, exclusive of a faintly granulated one which bounds the umbilicus. The glistening metallic lustre of the whole exterior is largely though not entirely due to the erosion of the delicate external layer of the shell.

In the Siboga-specimens the whole shell, perhaps with exception of the embryonic whorls, is covered by a thin yellowish layer, having the aspect of an epidermis, and only when this is removed, the metallic lustre appears. The basal carinae, if not eroded, are not smooth, in the majority of the specimens. There are only three of them, and a trace of an intermediate one near the aperture, the most central keel is decidedly adorned with small tubercles and also the other ones are slightly beaded or crenulated. The outer layer of the shell has a fibrous texture, in the interstices between the umbilical keel and the second basal keel, the surface has distinct riblike striae. The funnel-shaped, pervious umbilicus has the same riblike striae on its wall.

== Distribution ==
This marine species occurs off South Africa, Madagascar, Southern India and off Indonesia.
