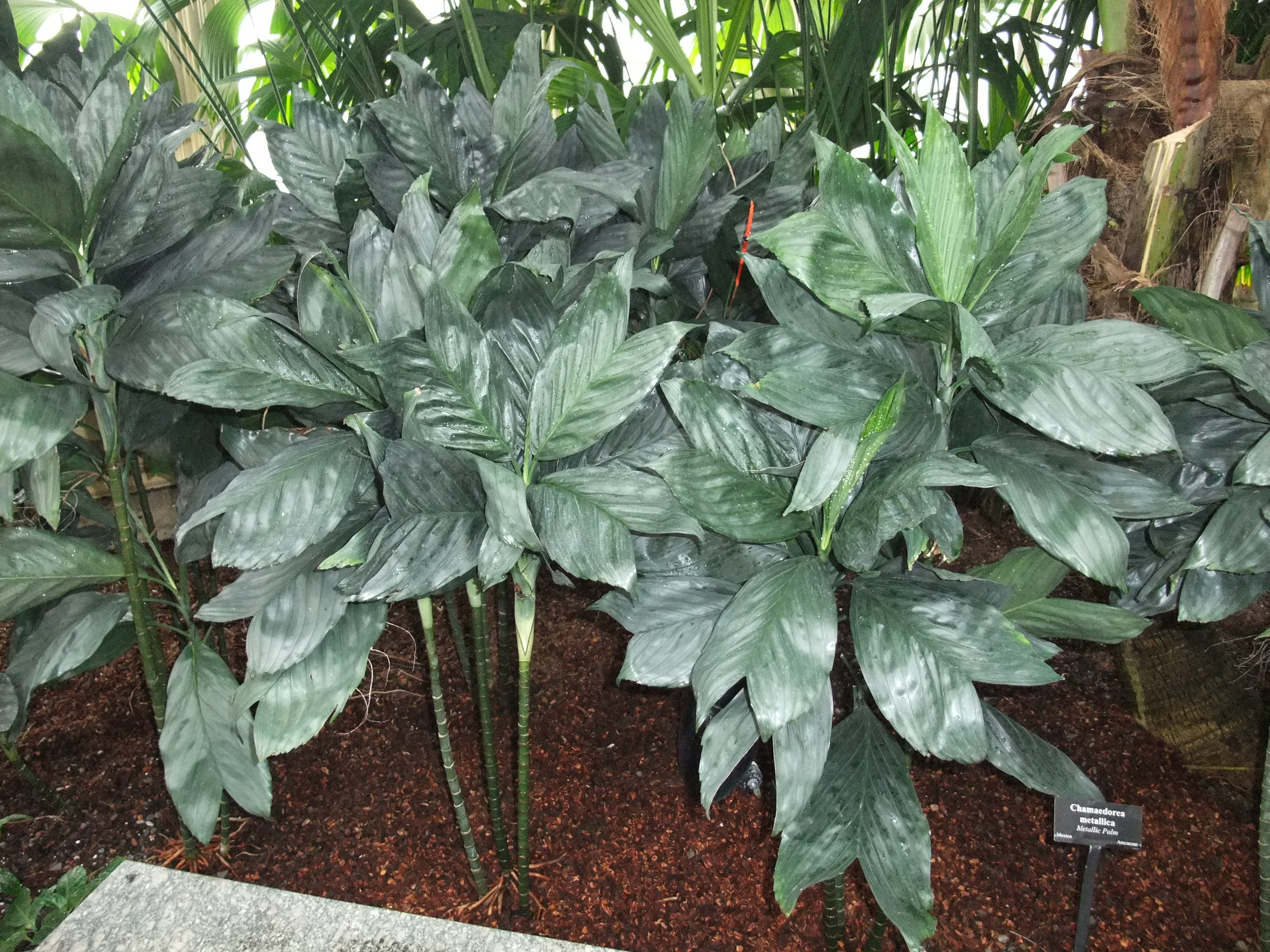

Scientific classification
- Kingdom: Plantae
- Clade: Tracheophytes
- Clade: Angiosperms
- Clade: Monocots
- Clade: Commelinids
- Order: Arecales
- Family: Arecaceae
- Genus: Chamaedorea
- Species: C. metallica

Binomial name
- Chamaedorea metallica O.F.Cook ex H.E.Moore

= Chamaedorea metallica =

Species of palm

Chamaedorea metallica is a species of flowering plant in the family Arecaceae.

== Distribution ==
Chamaedorea metallica is endemic in Southern Mexico.

== Cultivation ==
Chamaedorea metallica is a garden plant in sub-tropical climates, such as coastal Southern California, and in tropical regions. It is also a popular house plant.
