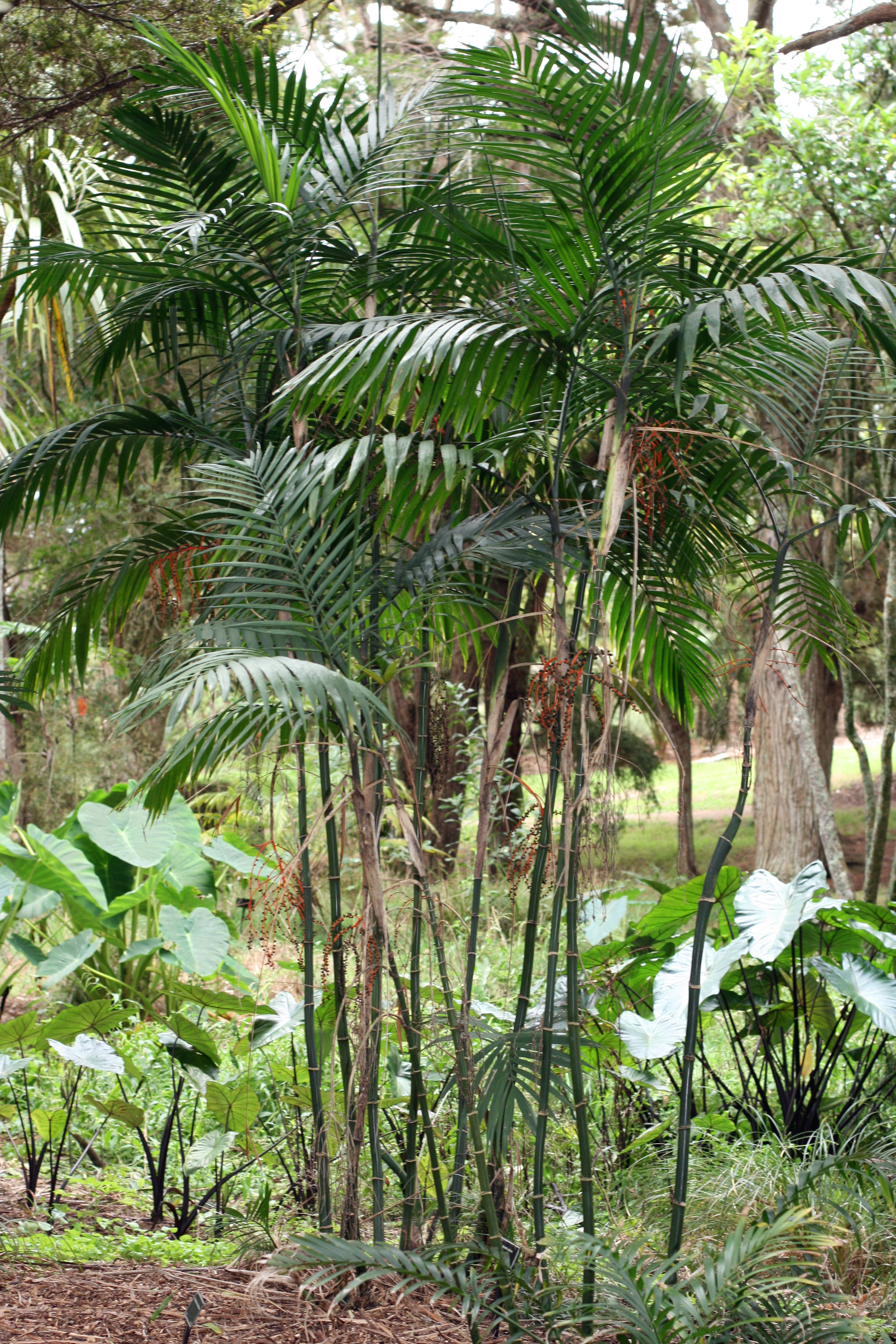
- Chamaedorea costaricana

Scientific classification
- Kingdom: Plantae
- Clade: Tracheophytes
- Clade: Angiosperms
- Clade: Monocots
- Clade: Commelinids
- Order: Arecales
- Family: Arecaceae
- Subfamily: Arecoideae
- Tribe: Chamaedoreeae
- Genus: Chamaedorea; Willd.

Species
- See text

Synonyms
- Anothea O.F.Cook nom. inval. Cladandra O.F.Cook; Collinia (Liebm.) Liebm. ex Oerst. Dasystachys Oerst. Discoma O.F.Cook; Docanthe O.F.Cook nom. inval. Eleutheropetalum H.Wendl. Eucheila O.F.Cook nom. inval. Kinetostigma Dammer; Kunthea Humb. & Bonpl. Legnea O.F.Cook nom. inval. Lobia O.F.Cook nom. inval. Lophothele O.F.Cook nom. inval. Mauranthe O.F.Cook; Meiota O.F.Cook nom. inval. Migandra O.F.Cook; Morenia Ruiz & Pav. Neanthe O.F.Cook; Nunnezharia Ruiz & Pav. Nunnezia Willd. Omanthe O.F.Cook nom. inval. Paranthe O.F.Cook nom. inval. Platythea O.F.Cook nom. inval. Spathoscaphe Oerst. Stachyophorbe (Liebm. ex Mart.) Liebm. Stephanostachys (Klotzsch) Klotzsch ex O.E.Schulz

= Chamaedorea =

Genus of palms

Chamaedorea is a genus of 107 species of palms, native to subtropical and tropical regions of the Americas. They are small palms, growing to 0.3–6 m (1 ft 0 in – 19 ft 8 in) tall with slender, cane-like stems, growing in the understory in rainforests, and often spreading by means of underground runners, forming clonal colonies. The leaves are pinnate (rarely entire), with one to numerous leaflets. The flowers are produced in inflorescences; they are dioecious, with male and female flowers on separate plants. The fruit is an orange or red drupe 0.5–2 cm diameter. Perhaps the best-known species is Chamaedorea elegans (neanthe bella palm or parlor palm) from Mexico and Guatemala. It is popular as a houseplant, particularly in Victorian houses. Another well-known species is Chamaedorea seifrizii, the bamboo palm or reed palm.

The name Chamaedorea comes from Ancient Greek χαμαί (chamai) 'on the ground' and δωρεά (dorea) 'gift', in reference to easily reached fruits, or the plants' low-growing nature.

== Species ==
- Chamaedorea adscendens (Dammer) Burret
- Chamaedorea allenii L.H.Bailey
- Chamaedorea alternans H.Wendl.
- Chamaedorea amabilis H.Wendl. ex Dammer
- Chamaedorea anemophila Hodel
- Chamaedorea angustisecta Burret
- Chamaedorea arenbergiana H.Wendl.
- Chamaedorea atrovirens Mart.
- Chamaedorea benziei Hodel
- Chamaedorea binderi Hodel
- Chamaedorea brachyclada H.Wendl.
- Chamaedorea brachypoda Standl. & Steyerm.
- Chamaedorea carchensis Standl. & Steyerm.
- Chamaedorea castillo-montii Hodel
- Chamaedorea cataractarum Mart.
- Chamaedorea christinae Hodel
- Chamaedorea correae Hodel & N.W.Uhl
- Chamaedorea costaricana Oerst.
- Chamaedorea crucensis Hodel
- Chamaedorea dammeriana Burret
- Chamaedorea deckeriana (Klotzsch) Hemsl.
- Chamaedorea deneversiana Grayum & Hodel
- Chamaedorea elatior Mart.
- Chamaedorea elegans Mart.
- Chamaedorea ernesti-augusti H.Wendl.
- Chamaedorea falcifera H.E.Moore
- Chamaedorea foveata Hodel
- Chamaedorea fractiflexa Hodel & Cast.Mont
- Chamaedorea fragrans Mart.
- Chamaedorea frondosa Hodel, Cast.Mont & Zúñiga
- Chamaedorea geonomiformis H.Wendl.
- Chamaedorea glaucifolia H.Wendl.
- Chamaedorea graminifolia H.Wendl.
- Chamaedorea guntheriana Hodel & N.W.Uhl
- Chamaedorea hodelii Grayum
- Chamaedorea hooperiana Hodel
- Chamaedorea ibarrae Hodel
- Chamaedorea incrustata Hodel, G.Herrera & Casc.Mont
- Chamaedorea keelerorum Hodel & Cast.Mont
- Chamaedorea klotzschiana H.Wendl.
- Chamaedorea latisecta (H.E.Moore) A.H.Gentry
- Chamaedorea lehmannii Burret
- Chamaedorea liebmannii Mart.
- Chamaedorea linearis (Ruiz & Pav.) Mart.
- Chamaedorea lucidifrons L.H.Bailey
- Chamaedorea macrospadix Oerst.
- Chamaedorea matae Hodel
- Chamaedorea metallica O.F.Cook ex H.E.Moore
- Chamaedorea microphylla H.Wendl.
- Chamaedorea microspadix Burret
- Chamaedorea moliniana Hodel, Cast.Mont & Zúñiga
- Chamaedorea murriensis Galeano
- Chamaedorea nationsiana Hodel & Cast.Mont
- Chamaedorea neurochlamys Burret
- Chamaedorea nubium Standl. & Steyerm.
- Chamaedorea oblongata Mart.
- Chamaedorea oreophila Mart.
- Chamaedorea pachecoana Standl. & Steyerm.
- Chamaedorea palmeriana Hodel & N.W.Uhl
- Chamaedorea parvifolia Burret
- Chamaedorea parvisecta Burret
- Chamaedorea pauciflora Mart.
- Chamaedorea pedunculata Hodel & N.W.Uhl
- Chamaedorea pinnatifrons (Jacq.) Oerst.
- Chamaedorea piscifolia Hodel, G.Herrera & Casc.
- Chamaedorea pittieri L.H.Bailey
- Chamaedorea plumosa Hodel
- Chamaedorea pochutlensis Liebm.
- Chamaedorea ponderosa Hodel
- Chamaedorea pumila H.Wendl. ex Dammer
- Chamaedorea pygmaea H.Wendl.
- Chamaedorea queroana Hodel
- Chamaedorea radicalis Mart.
- Chamaedorea recurvata Hodel
- Chamaedorea rhizomatosa Hodel
- Chamaedorea ricardoi R.Bernal, Galeano & Hodel
- Chamaedorea rigida H.Wendl. ex Dammer
- Chamaedorea robertii Hodel & N.W.Uhl
- Chamaedorea rojasiana Standl. & Steyerm.
- Chamaedorea rosibeliae Hodel, G.Herrera & Casc.
- Chamaedorea rossteniorum Hodel, G.Herrera & Casc.
- Chamaedorea sartorii Liebm.
- Chamaedorea scheryi L.H.Bailey
- Chamaedorea schiedeana Mart.
- Chamaedorea schippii Burret
- Chamaedorea seifrizii Burret
- Chamaedorea selvae Hodel
- Chamaedorea serpens Hodel
- Chamaedorea simplex Burret
- Chamaedorea skutchii Standl. & Steyerm.
- Chamaedorea smithii A.H.Gentry
- Chamaedorea stenocarpa Standl. & Steyerm.
- Chamaedorea stolonifera H.Wendl. ex Hook.f.
- Chamaedorea stricta Standl. & Steyerm.
- Chamaedorea subjectifolia Hodel
- Chamaedorea tenerrima Burret
- Chamaedorea tepejilote Liebm.
- Chamaedorea tuerckheimii (Dammer) Burret
- Chamaedorea undulatifolia Hodel & N.W.Uhl
- Chamaedorea verapazensis Hodel & Cast.Mont
- Chamaedorea verecunda Grayum & Hodel
- Chamaedorea volcanensis Hodel & Cast.Mont
- Chamaedorea vulgata Standl. & Steyerm.
- Chamaedorea warscewiczii H.Wendl.
- Chamaedorea whitelockiana Hodel & N.W.Uhl
- Chamaedorea woodsoniana L.H.Bailey
- Chamaedorea zamorae Hodel

=== Formerly placed here ===
- Synechanthus fibrosus (H.Wendl.) H.Wendl. (as C. fibrosa H.Wendl.)

== See also ==
- Xate
