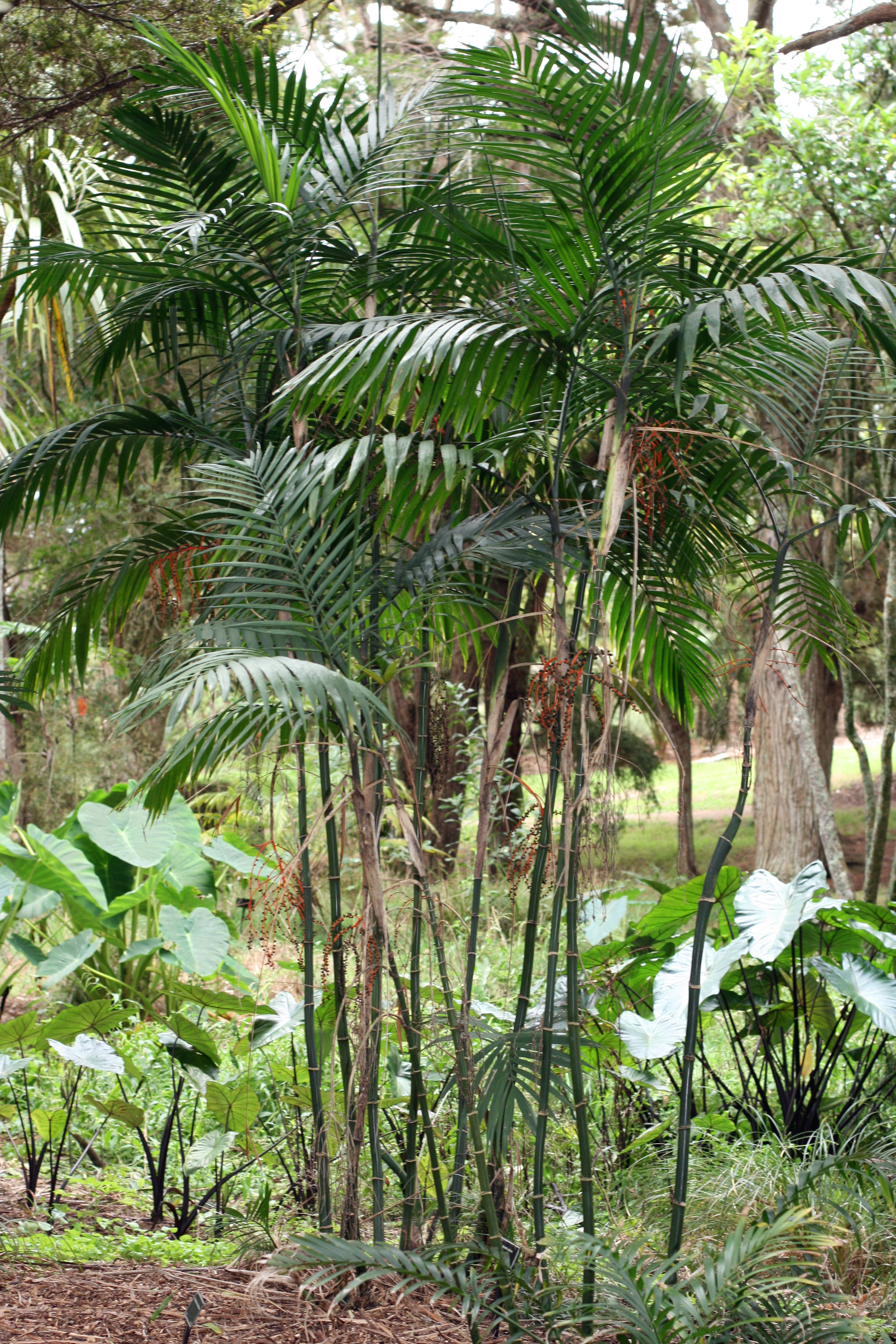

Scientific classification
- Kingdom: Plantae
- Clade: Tracheophytes
- Clade: Angiosperms
- Clade: Monocots
- Clade: Commelinids
- Order: Arecales
- Family: Arecaceae
- Genus: Chamaedorea
- Species: C. costaricana

Binomial name
- Chamaedorea costaricana Oerst., 1859

Synonyms
- Chamaedorea biolleyi Guillaumin; Chamaedorea linearia L.H.Bailey; Chamaedorea quezalteca Standl. & Steyerm.; Chamaedorea seibertii L.H.Bailey; Legnea laciniata O.F.Cook; Nunnezharia costaricana (Oerst.) Kuntze; Omanthe costaricana (Oerst.) O.F.Cook

= Chamaedorea costaricana =

Species of palm

Chamaedorea costaricana is a species of palm in the genus Chamaedorea, found in Central America. A common local name in Costa Rica is pacaya, though this is also used as a name for Chamaedorea tepejilote.

== Description ==
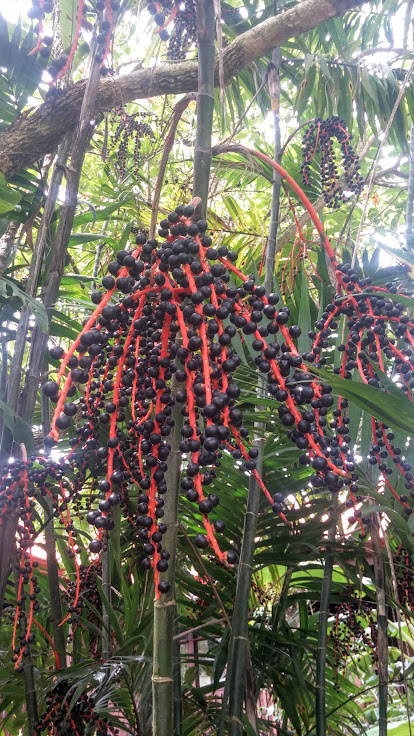
Ripe fruit cluster

They grow in colonies, with short horizontal stems under or at ground level, forming dense or open clumps, up to 6 m high and 2-6 cm in diameter, with internodes 5-30 cm long. Leaves 4-6, are erect-patent, pinnate 1-2 m long; with pinnae 20-26 on each side, slightly sigmoid or falcate, 25-40 cm long and 2.5-5 cm wide, long acuminate, 2 prominent nerves on each side of the main nerve, rachis 100-120 cm long; tubular sheath, 20-60 cm long, with an elongated triangular extension opposite the petiole insertion, forming auriculated lobes on each side of the petiole. The petiole is up to 35 cm long, abaxially with a pale band that extends to the sheath. Infrafoliar inflorescences, solitary, with peduncle 20-45 cm long, erect in flower, pendulum in fruit, bracts 5-8, rachis 10-20 cm long; inflorescences staminated with 15-30 splints, 20-30 cm long, flexuous and pendulous, green to yellow in flower, flowers 2.5-3.5 mm long and 2.5-3 mm wide, yellow-greenish, sepals free almost to the base, petals valved, free almost to the base; pistillate inflorescences with 10-20 slivers, 20-35 cm long, frequently only bifid, orange and bulging in fruit, flowers 3-3.5 mm long and 2-2.5 mm wide, in lax spirals, pale yellow, slightly sunken, sepals connate briefly at the base, petals imbricated almost to the apex, free. Fruits are globose to subglobose, 7-10 mm in diameter, green when unripe and turning black or black-purple when ripe.

== Distribution and ecology ==
It is found throughout Mexico and Central America, in Guatemala, Honduras, Costa Rica, Nicaragua, Panama, and El Salvador.

It is a common species in humid or very humid forests, cloud forests, and dwarf forests, at an altitude of 600-1650 meters. It tolerates full sun, but is found to prefer shade in hot, inland climates.

== Bibliography ==
1. Correa A., M. D., C. Galdames & M. N. S. Stapf. 2004. Cat. Pl. Vasc. Panamá 1–599. Smithsonian Tropical Research Institute, Panama.
2. Grayum, M. H. 2003. Arecaceae. In: Manual de Plantas de Costa Rica, B.E. Hammel, M.H. Grayum, C. Herrera & N. Zamora (eds.). Monogr. Syst. Bot. Missouri Bot. Gard. 92: 201–293.
3. Henderson, A., G. Galeano & R. Bernal. 1995. Field Guide Palms Americas 1–352. Princeton University Press, Princeton, New Jersey.
4. Hodel, D. R. 1992. Chamaedorea Palms 1–338. The International Palm Society, Lawrence.
5. Hodel, D. R., J. J. C. Mont & R. Zuniga. 1995. Two new species of Chamaedorea from Honduras. Principes 39(4): 183–189.
6. Stevens, W. D., C. U. U., A. Pool & O. M. Montiel. 2001. Flora de Nicaragua. Monogr. Syst. Bot. Missouri Bot. Gard. 85: i–xlii, 1–2666.
