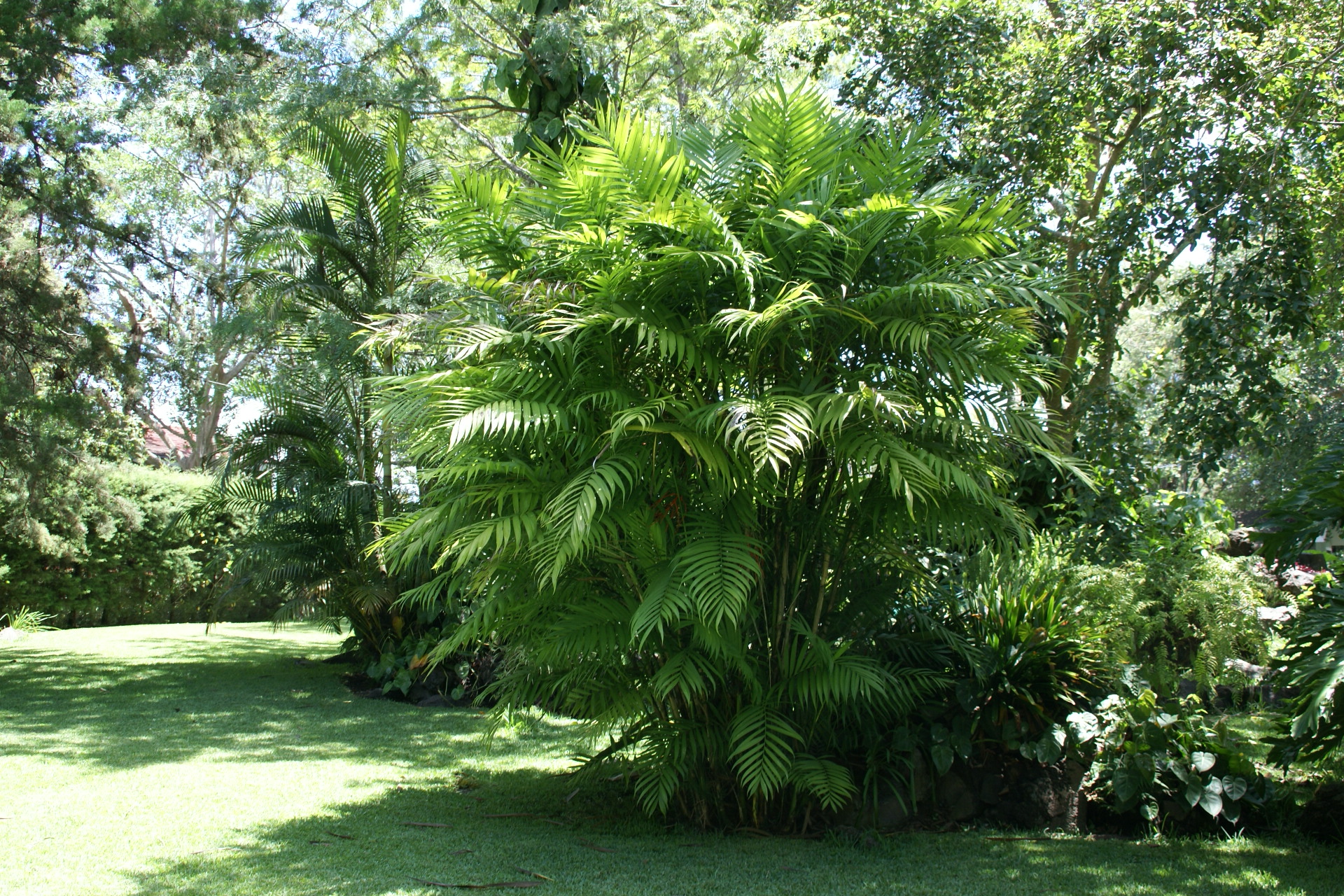
- Pacaya palm (Chamaedorea tepejilote) taken at Atitlán Lake in Guatemala

Scientific classification
- Kingdom: Plantae
- Clade: Tracheophytes
- Clade: Angiosperms
- Clade: Monocots
- Clade: Commelinids
- Order: Arecales
- Family: Arecaceae
- Genus: Chamaedorea
- Species: C. tepejilote

Binomial name
- Chamaedorea tepejilote Liebm.

= Chamaedorea tepejilote =

Species of palm

Chamaedorea tepejilote, also known as the pacaya palm, is a species of Chamaedorea palm tree found in the understory of the forests of southern Mexico, Central America, and northern Colombia.

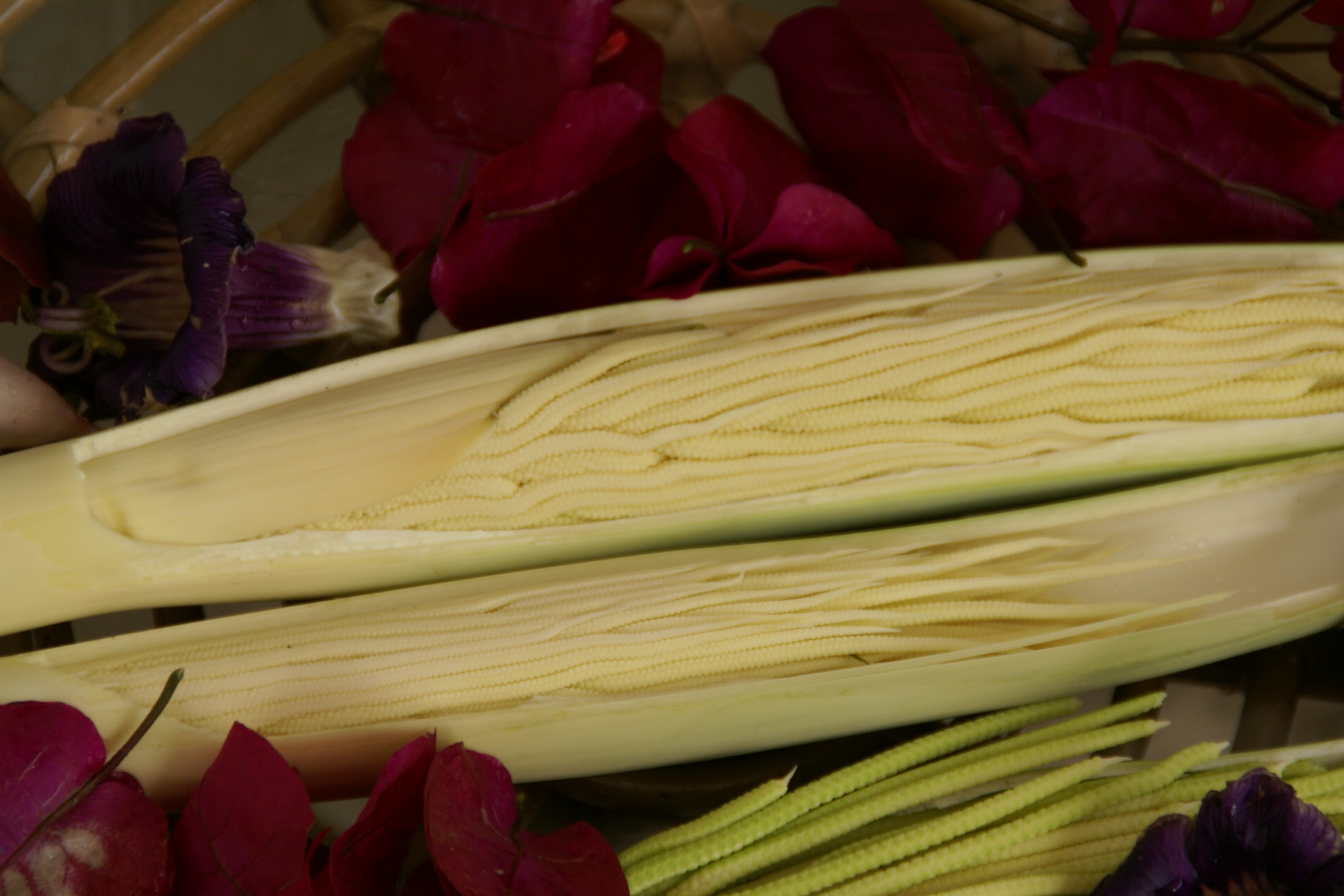
Edible inflorescence of the pacaya palm (with other flowers)

== Uses ==
The immature male inflorescences of the plant are considered a delicacy in Guatemala and El Salvador. The unopened inflorescences resemble an ear of corn in appearance and size. Indeed, the word tepejilote means "mountain maize" in the Nahuatl language and was selected because of this resemblance. The common name pacaya, referring to both the plant and its edible flowers, could be derived from the Pacaya volcano.

Pacaya has a somewhat bitter taste, although less so in cultivated varieties. It is eaten in salads (especially fiambre, a salad traditionally eaten in Guatemala on the Day of the Dead) or covered in egg batter and fried. The latter dish is called envueltos de pacaya, and is often served with tomato sauce, like chiles rellenos.
