= Saribus chocolatinus =

Scientific classification
- Kingdom: Plantae
- Clade: Tracheophytes
- Clade: Angiosperms
- Clade: Monocots
- Clade: Commelinids
- Order: Arecales
- Family: Arecaceae
- Tribe: Trachycarpeae
- Genus: Saribus
- Species: S. chocolatinus

Binomial name
- Saribus chocolatinus (Dowe) C.D.Bacon & W.J.Baker

Synonyms
- Livistona chocolatina Dowe

Species of palm tree

Saribus chocolatinus is a species of palm tree in the genus Saribus, which is native to Papua New Guinea. It is a fan palm.

It is known as manganau in the Kamiali (Lababia) dialect of the Kala language.

== Taxonomy ==
Saribus chocolatinus was only relatively recently described as a new species. This was done by John Leslie Dowe in his 2004 treatment of the taxon. At the time the genus Saribus, which had officially been described in the 19th century (it had been created in the 17th century by Rumphius), was not recognised, and the species was described as Livistona chocolatina. Soon, however, new phylogenetic research was published, comparing the DNA of different species of Livistona, which found that the genus was polyphyletic. Thus the authors, Christine Bacon and William J. Baker, resurrected, i.e. re-recognised, Saribus, and the species was moved to the genus by them in 2011.

The species had been collected thrice before it had been formally named. The British forester Charles Lane Poole had collected the palm in 1922, during his three years survey of the timber resources of Papua New Guinea, then an Australian territory, in the hills inland from the Vailala River in Gulf Province, and had listed it as 'Livistona sp. No. 332' in 1925. It was collected again in 1998 by the palm specialist Michael D. Ferrero at the type locality, near the Kuriva Mission in central Central Province, whose specimens were all sent to be stored in the Papua New Guinea National Herbarium. The holotype was then collected in 2000 by Anders S. Barford, accompanied by Roy Banka, John L. Dowe and Anders Kjær, at the same approximate location Ferrero had found the population previously. The collection number is #466. The holotype is housed at the herbarium of the Aarhus University in Denmark. Isotypes were sent to the herbarium at the Royal Botanic Gardens, Kew, the Queensland Herbarium, the Australian National Herbarium and the Papua New Guinea National Herbarium.

== Description ==
It is a hermaphrodite palm with a solitary trunk up to 22 metres in height, with a trunk diameter at breast height of 16 to 18cm. The trunk does not swell at the base, where the roots are. The outer layer of the trunk is very hard. The leaf or petiole scars are inconspicuous, and slightly raised, only the upper part of the trunk shows irregular longitudinal furrows. The internodes between the leaf scars are narrow. The trunk is light grey, and the old dead petiole stubs not retained on it. This is a palm without a crownshaft. There are 30 to 40 leaves in the globe-shaped crown.

The leaves are fan-shaped and plicate. The segments are connected to each other near the centre of the leaf, but this character is highly variable, although it is generally greatest with young leaves. The petiole can be up to 154cm in length, and lacks armature, being spineless.

The eophyll, which is the first fully-expanded leaf of a seedling palm, has five ribs. Only the seedlings have spines on their leaves.

=== Similar species ===
Although Bacon and Baker do not provide a key to the nine species of Saribus, one can be found in the key provided by Dowe in his 2009 Livistona monograph, where the eight species which were transferred to Saribus are split from the rest in the beginning of the key. S. chocolatinus keys out together with S. woodfordii, S. papuanus and S. merrillii which all have inflorescences that divide to the third order. S. papuanus and S. merrillii have yellow flowers as opposed to red. S. woodfordii can be distinguished from S. chocolatinus by having somewhat hanging ends of the leaf segments, as opposed to rigid, a deeply undulate leaf blade. S. woodfordii has half as short inflorescence brachlets (rachillae) at 4 to 6cm long. These rachillae are also half as thick at 1mm. S. chocolatinus is furthermore the only species to have its rachillae covered throughout in tomentose indumentum -this is chocolate-brown at their bases, turning cream-green near their ends, whereas S. woodfordii only has tomentum at the bases of the rachillae, and this is coloured purplish-brown.

== Distribution ==
Saribus chocolatinus occurs in Central, Gulf and Morobe Province. It is spatially distributed as colonies isolated from each other, these colonies can be quite dense and extensive, and the palm can be locally common here.

== Ecology ==
It has been collected at 165 to 300 metres in altitude, but in his 2009 monograph Dowe states it is found at 300 to 400 metres. It grows in the forest on the slopes of foothills. It is a species which grows to become part of the subcanopy. It has mostly been collected growing on ultrabasic soil, but in 2009 Dowe states it grows in calcareous or clayey soils. It blooms in January and February, and has fruits in March to May.

== Conservation ==
The conservation status of Saribus chocolatinus has not been assessed by the IUCN. In his 2009 monograph, Dowe suggests a conservation status of 'vulnerable', although he does not disclose how he came to this conclusion, nor according to which criteria he is judging the species.

S. chocolatinus grows within the protected area of the Kamiali, a Wildlife Management Area in Morobe Province. It is very common in places here.
