= Calyptrocalyx amoenus =

Scientific classification
- Kingdom: Plantae
- Clade: Tracheophytes
- Clade: Angiosperms
- Clade: Monocots
- Clade: Commelinids
- Order: Arecales
- Family: Arecaceae
- Genus: Calyptrocalyx
- Species: C. amoenus

Binomial name
- Calyptrocalyx amoenus Dowe & M.D.Ferrero

Species of palm

Calyptrocalyx amoenus is a palm species in the family Arecaceae, and is native to Papua New Guinea and to the Indonesian part of New Guinea, Western New Guinea.

== Taxonomy ==
Calyptrocalyx amoenus was first described in 2001 by John Dowe and Michael Ferrero. The species epithet, amoenus, derives from the Latin for "delightful", amoena.
