= Max Hollrung =

German botanist (1858–1937)

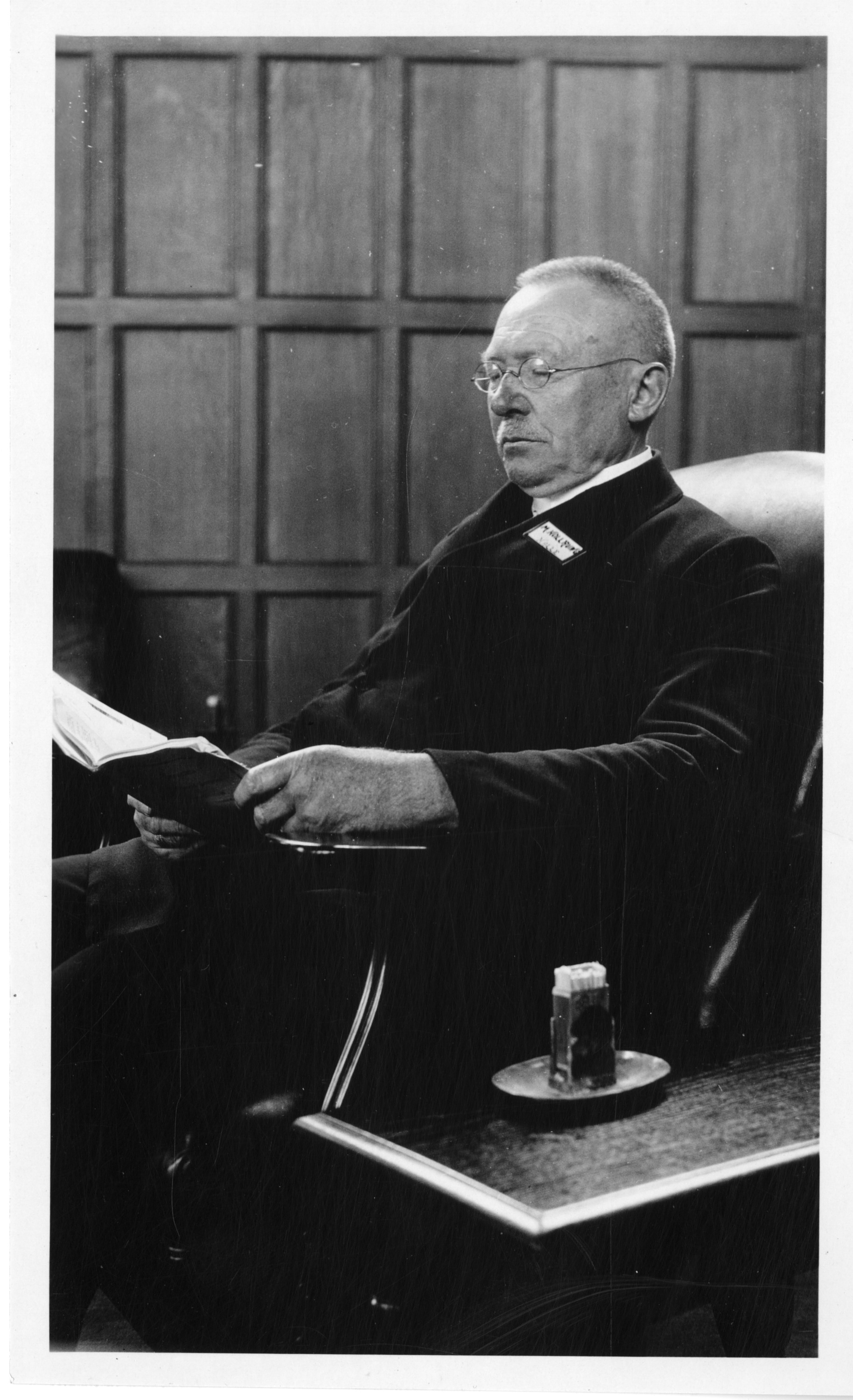
- August 1926 at the Fourth International Botanical Congress, Cornell University
- Born: Max Udo Hollrung; 25 October 1858; Hosterwitz, Dresden
- Died: 5 May 1937 (aged 78); Halle (Saale)
- Scientific career
- Fields: Botany, plant pathology
- Author abbrev. (botany): Hollrung

Max Udo Hollrung (25 October 1858 in Hosterwitz, Dresden – 5 May 1937 in Halle (Saale)) was a German botanist, and an early specialist in phytopathology. He was the first university teacher in Germany to be appointed to teach on the subject of plant diseases and plant protection at a university. The standard author abbreviation Hollrung is used to indicate this person as the author when citing a botanical name.

== Life and work ==
Hollrung was the son of a master mason. He studied natural sciences, in particular, chemistry, acquiring his doctorate from the University of Leipzig in 1882. After a three-year assistantship at the Agriculture-Chemical Experimental Station in Halle (Saale), he participated in a research expedition to New Guinea from 1886 to 1888. At his return, Julius Kühn transferred him to the Agricultural Institute of the University of Halle, to work in the newly established Research Center for Nematode Control. From 1898 Hollrung was head of the experimental station for crop protection of the Chamber of Agriculture of the province of Saxony in Halle / Saale. From 1898, he was head of the Plant Health Experimental Station of the Chamber of the Province of Saxony, in Halle. In 1905, he edited "Lektorat für Pflanzenkrankheiten" ("Diseases of plants") at the University of Halle, and worked there until 1930.

He promoted the development of plant pathology, notably through his "Handbook of Chemicals for the Control of Plant Diseases" (first edition 1898) and his "Annual Reports on Innovations and Benefits in the Field of Plant Diseases" (1898–1913). Hollrung was head of the first research center in the field of crop protection and the first full-time university teacher for this field in Germany. As a researcher, he played a significant role in the examination of copper salts as a plant protection product, in the study of diseases of grapevine and potato. Throughout his life he looked for ways to practise preventive crop protection, especially with arable and organic farming. Many of his attempts to develop biological plant protection measures were acknowledged only after his death.

== Honours ==
=== Some species named for him ===
- (Arecaceae) Calyptrocalyx hollrungii (Becc.) Dowe & M.D.Ferrero
- (Dryopteridaceae) Chlamydogramme hollrungii (Kuhn) Holttum
- (Euphorbiaceae) Mallotus hollrungianus K.Schum. (now a synonym of Melanolepis multiglandulosa (Reinw. ex Blume) Rchb. & Zoll.)
- (Orchidaceae) Pedilonum hollrungii (Kraenzl.) Rauschert (synonym of Dendrobium smillieae F.Muell.)
- (Rubiaceae) Gynochthodes hollrungiana (Valeton) Razafim. & B.Bremer
- (Loranthaceae) Decaisnina hollrungii (K.Schum.) Barlow

== Some publications ==
- Annual report on innovations and services in the field of plant diseases Jahresbericht über die Neuerungen und Leistungen auf dem Gebiet der Pflanzenkrankheiten. Herausgegeben von Max Hollrung. Verlag Paul Parey Berlin Jg. 1–16, 1898–1913.
- Handbook of chemical remedies for plant diseases. Handbuch der chemischen Mittel gegen Pflanzenkrankheiten. Herstellung und Anwendung im Großen. Verlag Paul Parey Berlin 1898; 2. erw. u. verb. Aufl. unter dem Titel Die Mittel zur Bekämpfung der Pflanzenkrankheiten, ebd. 1914; 3. vollständig umgearb. Aufl. ebd. 1923.
- Brief guide to identifying, assessing, preventing and eliminating major plant diseases Kurzgefaßte Anleitung zur Erkennung, Beurteilung, Verhütung und Beseitigung der wichtigsten Pflanzenkrankheiten. Verlag Jänecke Hannover 1907 = Bibliothek der gesamten Landwirtschaft H. 23.
- The pathological conditions of the seeds, their causes and their remedy Die krankhaften Zustände des Saatgutes, ihre Ursachen und Behebung. In: Kühn-Archiv Bd. 8, 1919, S. 1–352. – Zugl. im Buchhandel: Verlag Paul Parey Berlin 1919.
- The detection of field, meadow and willow grasses, taking into account their inflorescences. For use of working farmers. Die Erkennung der Feld-, Wiesen- und Weide-Ungräser unter Berücksichtigung ihrer Blütenstände. Zum Gebrauch für berufstätige Landwirte bearbeitet. In: Wissenschaftliches Archiv für Landwirtschaft, Abt. A, Archiv für Pflanzenbau Bd. 2, 1929, S. 563–703. – Zugl. im Buchhandel: Verlag Julius Springer Berlin 1930.
- 100 years of potato disease. A critical review 100 Jahre Kartoffelkrankheit. Ein kritischer Rückblick. In: Kühn-Archiv Bd. 33, 1932, S. 29–122. Zugl. im Buchhandel: Verlag Hall. Nachrichten Halle/S. 1932.
- (with von Schumann) 1889. Die Flora von Kaiser Wilhelms Land. Kommissions – Verlag: Asher & Co, Berlin.
