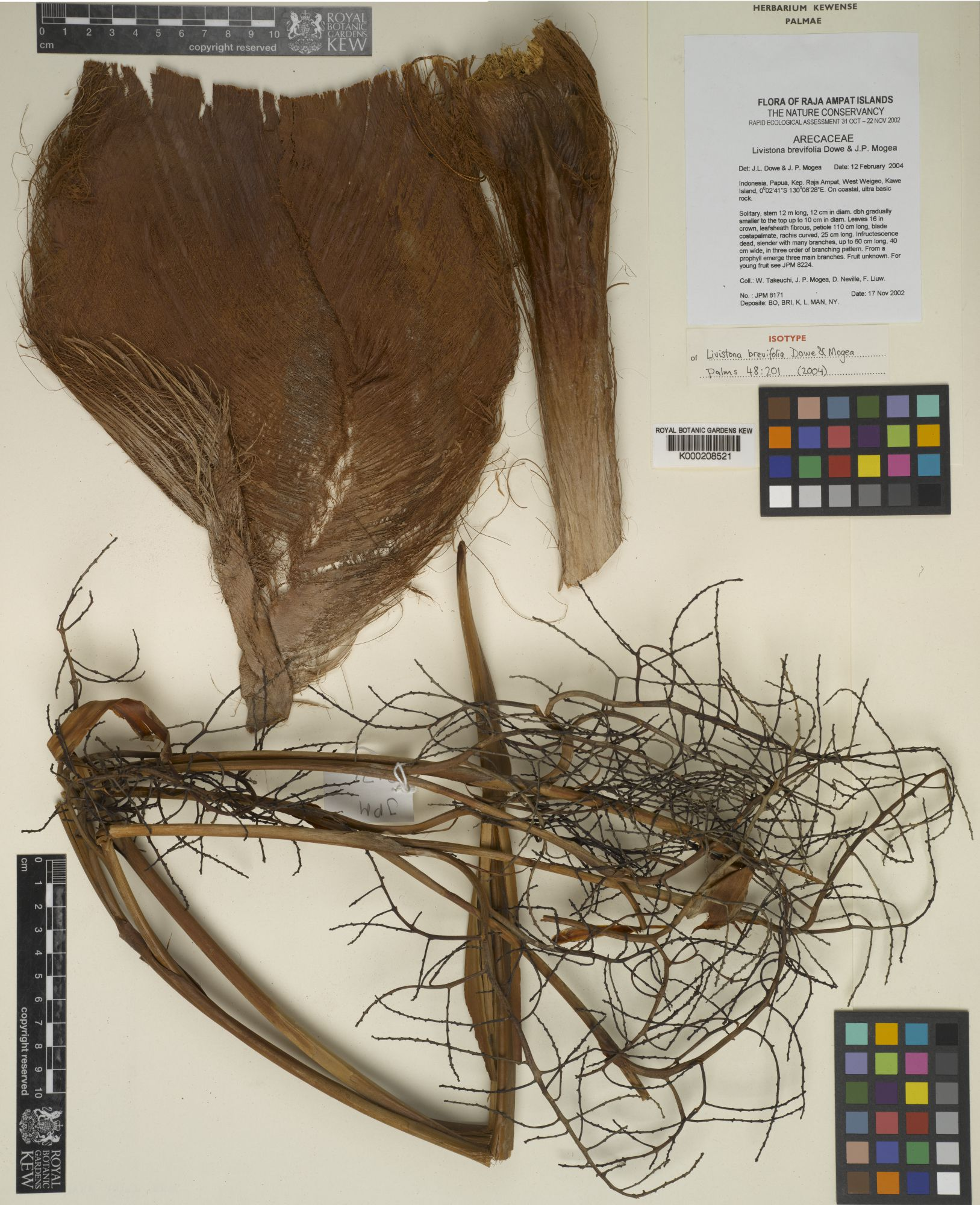
- isotype at the Kew Herbarium: dried infructescence & fibrous leaf-sheath around the petiole base

Scientific classification
- Kingdom: Plantae
- Clade: Tracheophytes
- Clade: Angiosperms
- Clade: Monocots
- Clade: Commelinids
- Order: Arecales
- Family: Arecaceae
- Tribe: Trachycarpeae
- Genus: Saribus
- Species: S. brevifolius

Binomial name
- Saribus brevifolius (Dowe & Mogea) C.D.Bacon & W.J.Baker

Synonyms
- Livistona brevifolia Dowe & Mogea

= Saribus brevifolius =

Species of palm tree

Saribus brevifolius is a species of palm tree in the genus Saribus, which has only been found in the Kawe and Gag Islands in the archipelago of the Raja Ampat Islands, which lie off the north-west tip of the Bird's Head Peninsula in Indonesia's West Papua province. It was only discovered in 2002 during an expedition funded by The Nature Conservancy. The palm grows along the coasts of these two tropical islands on small ridges composed of ultrabasic rock. It is a moderately-sized fan palm with smallish and regularly segmented leaves and a smallish inflorescence in the crown. The inflorescence is not longer than the leaves, and split at its base into three main branches with one or more sub-inflorescences, these containing red flowers with pink anthers. The ends of S. brevifolius leaf segments are rigid and have a bifurcate cleft 1-4% of the segment length.

== Taxonomy ==
Saribus brevifolius was only relatively recently described as a new species. It was discovered in 2002 during a 'rapid ecological assessment' survey of the Raja Ampat Islands by The Nature Conservancy. The holotype was collected by an international team of plant collectors on the Kawe Islands north-west off Waigeo island. The collection number is JPM#8171. The collection number JPM#8224 is from the same population, and was collected at the same time: it is of the young fruit of the palm.

The formal species description was done by John Leslie Dowe and Johanis P. Mogea in 2004. At the time the genus Saribus, which had been created in the 19th century, was not recognised, and the species was described as Livistona brevifolia. Soon, however, new phylogenetic research comparing the DNA of different species of Livistona was published, which found that the genus was polyphyletic. Thus the authors, Christine D. Bacon and William John Baker, resurrected, i.e. re-recognised, Saribus, and the species was moved to this genus by them in 2011.

The holotype is housed at the Herbarium Bogoriense in Indonesia. Isotypes were also deposited at the herbarium at the Royal Botanic Gardens, Kew, the herbarium of the University of Papua in Manokwari, the National Herbarium of the Netherlands in Leiden and the William and Lynda Steere Herbarium of the New York Botanical Garden.

== Description ==
=== Habitus ===
This plant is a hermaphrodite fan palm. This palm tree can become quite large, it grows up to 22 metres (72 ft) in height, often shorter, with an at least 12 centimetres (4.7 in) trunk diameter at breast height, gradually becoming more slender towards the top, up to 10 cm in diameter. The palm grows with a solitary trunk. The leaf or petiole scars left behind on the trunk are slightly raised, and light grey in colour; the internodes between the scars are narrow. The stubs of the petioles are not persistent, i.e. they do not remain clinging onto the trunk for long. There are sixteen, sometimes up to forty, leaves in the roundish crown.

=== Leaf ===
It has smallish leaves for a Saribus palm. The leaf-sheath is fibrous. The petiole is some 110 cm in length. It is 29 to 42mm wide where it connects to the trunk, 12 to 13mm wide at the other end, slightly arching, and green. The upper, the adaxial side, is slightly concave, glabrous, with waxy, white scales on this top surface -which eventually fall off, whereas the underside, the abaxial side, is rounded. The margins of the petiole lack spines. The base of the petiole is covered in a single woven layer of coarse, brown fibres. These fibres remain until the leaf falls off, then begin to disintegrate. The 'appendages', fibres forming tongue-like straps on either side of the leaf-base, are 12 to 25 cm long. The hastula, which is a lip-like structure found in palms at the junction of the petiole and the leaf blade, is poorly developed, strongly asymmetric, and lobed.

The leaf blade, or lamina, is costapalmate, its rachis is curved, and about 25 cm long. It is regularly divided, for 17-53% of its length, into 22 to 25 segments. The leaf blade is semi-circular, rigid, moderately undulate (wavy) in profile, 55 to 62 cm in length and 45 to 55 cm wide. Its upper side is coloured mid-green, the underside light green. Each segment is bifurcated at its apical tip, with a split being 1-4% of the length of the segment. The segments are 2 to 2.5 cm wide at the point where the segments split from each other and the rest of the leaf blade. The segments are held rigidly aloft to their ends, and are not drooping. In each segment there are five to seven parallel veins on each side of the midrib. There are also transverse veins, which are thinner than these parallel veins.

=== Flowers ===
Like all palms in the genus Saribus, the inflorescences are trifurcated, splitting into three branches at its base, and branched to the third order. It is up to 60 cm long, and about 40 cm wide, not extending beyond the length of the leaves in the crown. The prophyll, the first bract borne on and containing the inflorescence of a palm, is glabrous, papery, 35 to 45 cm in length, 2.5 to 3.5 cm in width, with an entire, undivided tip. The prophyll opens to show the three main branches. These three main branches are similar, but the central one is slightly longer and more robust than either of the side ones. The peduncle of the central branch is subterete (almost round) to laterally compressed in perpendicular profile, and 18 to 20mm in diameter, whereas the peduncles of lateral branches are terete, and 8 to 12mm in diameter. This species lacks peduncular bracts. Each of these three main branches has two or three 'partial inflorescences', these are initially protected within 15 to 25 cm long rachis bracts, which are tightly tubular in shape and papery in texture, and have their tips remain intact with maturity. The bases of these partial inflorescences are covered with a green tomentose indumentum. The branchlets (rachillae) of these structures are straight, 4 to 9 cm long, about 0.5mm thick, subterete to angular in perpendicular profile, are coloured red at anthesis (when the flowers begin to open) and covered in a pubescent indumentum.

The flowers can be either solitary or are clustered in small groups of two to four. The sepals are red, fused at their base, with their free lobes being 1.0 to 1.2mm long. The petals are about 2mm in length, coloured red, thick and fleshy, and roughly triangular in shape. They are fused (connate) from their base to about half their length. The margins (edges) of the petal tips are recurved. The stamens are much shorter than petals. Their basal part is fused (adnate) to petal, with flat shoulders. The filament is very short. The anthers are pink and 0.2mm in length.

=== Fruit ===
The infructescence is slender with many rachillae. The pedicel is 2 to 3mm in length, and about 1mm thick. The fruit is round and 10 to 12mm in diameter at maturity. Its epicarp is thin and smooth, but when the fruit dries the surface becomes minutely tuberculate and showing scattered lenticels. The stigmatic scar is near the apical end. Its mesocarp ('flesh') is thin and not fibrous in texture. The endocarp is thin and has a hard crust. The seed is round and about 8 to 10mm in diameter; the testa intrudes into its endosperm surface except about a quarter at the end. A cross-section of the seed shows that the soft tissue within is irregularly shaped with small "intrusions extending to the outer edge of the endosperm". The embryo is supra-lateral and about 1mm long.

=== Similar species ===
Saribus brevifolius occurs on Kawe sympatrically with S. rotundifolius, but the two species are found in different habitats. S. brevifolius occurs on well-drained slopes and on low ridges, whereas S. rotundifolius occupies swamp forests in moist depressions.

== Distribution ==
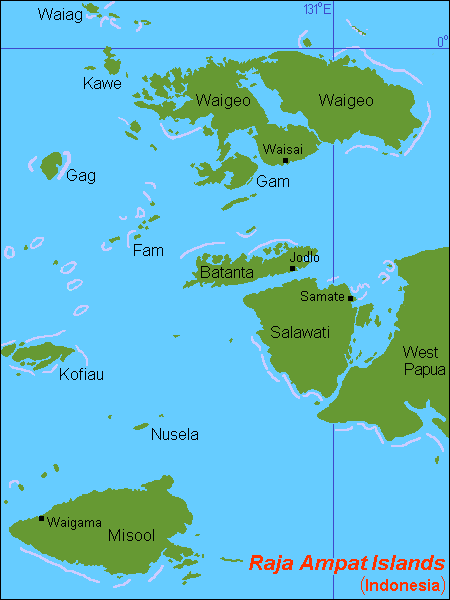
Kawe, Gag and the Raja Ampat Islands

Saribus brevifolius has only been collected on the main island of the Kawe Islands which lie north-west off the large island of Waigeo, part of the Raja Ampat Islands, which lie off the north-west tip of the Bird's Head Peninsula in Indonesia's West Papua province, near the Maluku Islands. It has also been seen on nearby Gag Island.

== Ecology ==
Its preferred habitat is in coastal situations on thin soil on ultrabasic rock, in open forest at altitudes of 10 to 20 metres on well-drained slopes and on low ridges. It forms dense colonies in such locations and forms part of the canopy here.

== Conservation ==
The conservation status of Saribus brevifolius has not been assessed by the IUCN. In his 2009 monograph, Dowe suggests a conservation status of 'near threatened', although he does not disclose how he came to this conclusion, nor according to which criteria he is judging the species.
