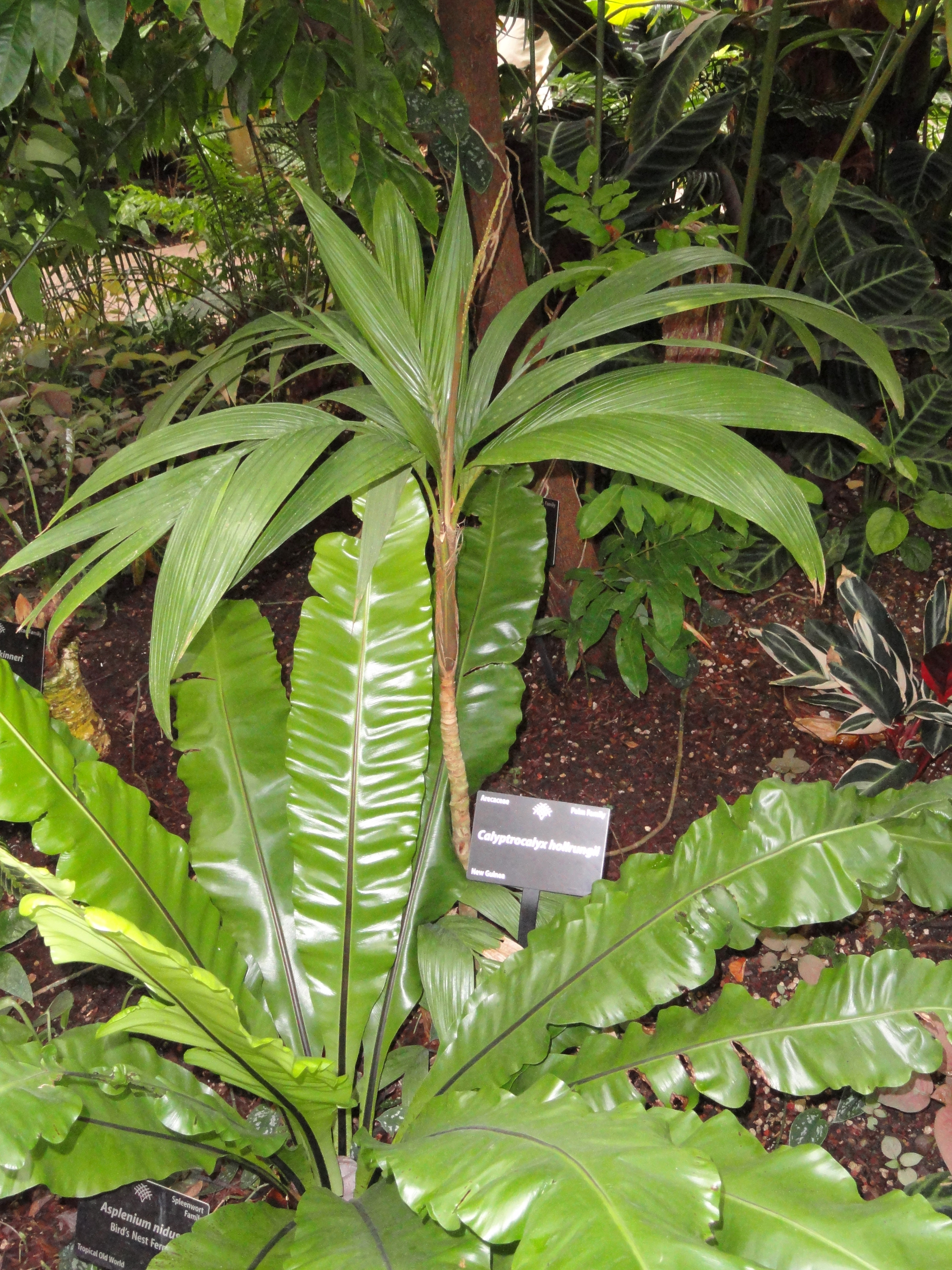

Scientific classification
- Kingdom: Plantae
- Clade: Tracheophytes
- Clade: Angiosperms
- Clade: Monocots
- Clade: Commelinids
- Order: Arecales
- Family: Arecaceae
- Genus: Calyptrocalyx
- Species: C. hollrungii

Binomial name
- Calyptrocalyx hollrungii (Becc.) Dowe & M.D.Ferrero

Synonyms
- Linospadix hollrungii Becc.; Linospadix schlechteri Becc.; Paralinospadix clemensiae Burret; Paralinospadix hollrungii (Becc.) Burret; Paralinospadix schlechteri (Becc.) Burret

= Calyptrocalyx hollrungii =

Species of palm

Calyptrocalyx hollrungii is a palm species in the family Arecaceae, and is native to Papua New Guinea and to the Indonesian part of New Guinea, Western New Guinea.

== Taxonomy ==
Calyptrocalyx hollrungii was first described in 1889 by Odoardo Beccari as Linospadix hollrungii, with the species epithet, hollrungii, chosen to honour Max Hollrung. It was assigned to the genus, Calyptrocalyx, in 2001by John Dowe and Michael Ferrero in 2001.
