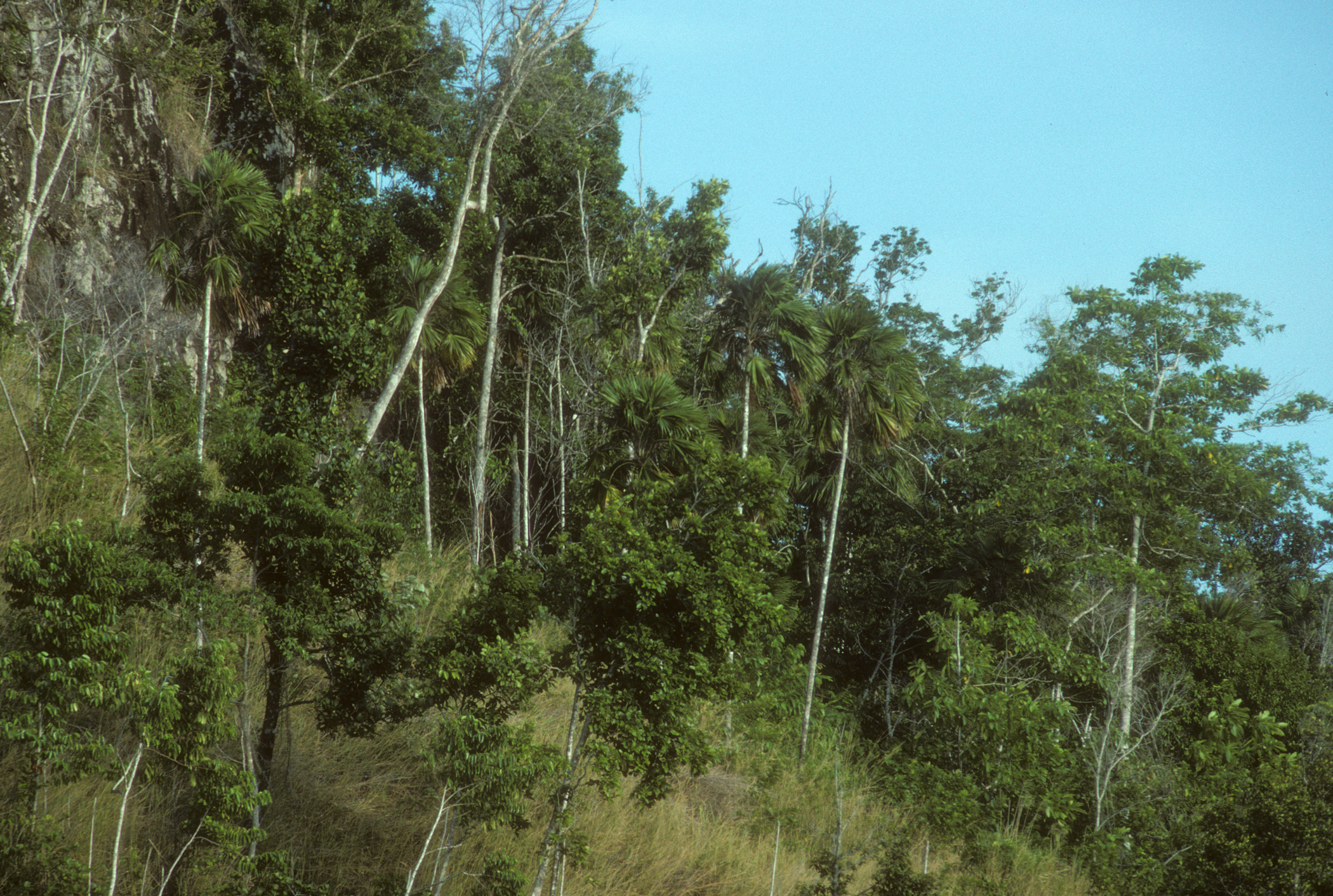
- Habitat on Tulagi, Solomon Islands

Scientific classification
- Kingdom: Plantae
- Clade: Tracheophytes
- Clade: Angiosperms
- Clade: Monocots
- Clade: Commelinids
- Order: Arecales
- Family: Arecaceae
- Tribe: Trachycarpeae
- Genus: Saribus
- Species: S. woodfordii

Binomial name
- Saribus woodfordii (Ridl.) C.D.Bacon & W.J.Baker

Synonyms
- Livistona woodfordi Ridl.; Livistona beccarian Burret

= Saribus woodfordii =

Species of palm

Saribus woodfordii is a species of fan palm which is native to an area from southeastern Papua New Guinea to the Solomon Islands.

== Taxonomy ==
S. woodfordii was first collected in 1897 or 1898 on the island of Makira, also known as San Cristobal, in the Solomon Islands, by the German plant collector Wilhelm Micholitz. It was first described in 1898 under the name Livistona woodfordi by Henry Nicholas Ridley. Christine D. Bacon and William J. Baker moved the species to the resurrected genus Saribus in 2011. The name was later corrected to Livistona woodfordii. A holotype was never designated by Ridley, so a lectotype was selected by John Leslie Dowe in 2009. Dowe chose the specimen sheet in The Natural History Museum in London, with isolectotypes designated in herbaria in the Museo di Storia Naturale di Firenze, Singapore Botanic Gardens and the Kew Herbarium.

== Description ==
This plant is a hermaphrodite fan palm. It has a trunk up to 16 metres (52 ft) in height, and 12–20 centimetres (4.7–7.9 in) diameter at breast height. The leaf or petiole scars are slightly raised, with irregular widths, and light grey in colour; the internodes between the scars are broad, and become greyish-brown to grey with age. The stubs of the petioles are not persistent, i.e. they do not remain clinging onto the trunk for long.

=== Similar species ===
Although Bacon and Baker do not provide a key to the nine species of Saribus, one can be found in the key provided by Dowe in his 2009 Livistona monograph, where the eight species which were transferred to Saribus are split from the rest in the beginning of the key. S. woodfordii keys out together with S. chocolatinus, S. papuanus and S. merrillii which all have inflorescences that divide to the third order. S. papuanus and S. merrillii have yellow flowers as opposed to red. S. woodfordii can be distinguished from S. chocolatinus by having somewhat hanging ends of the leaf segments, as opposed to rigid, a deeply undulate leaf blade. S. woodfordii has half as short inflorescence brachlets (rachillae) at 4 to 6 cm long. These rachillae are also half as thick at 1mm. S. chocolatinus is furthermore the only species to have its rachillae covered throughout in tomentose indumentum -this is chocolate-brown at their bases, turning cream-green near their ends, whereas S. woodfordii only has tomentum at the bases of the rachillae, and this is coloured purplish-brown.

== Uses ==
It was cultivated in the Singapore Botanic Gardens, at least in the 1920s.
