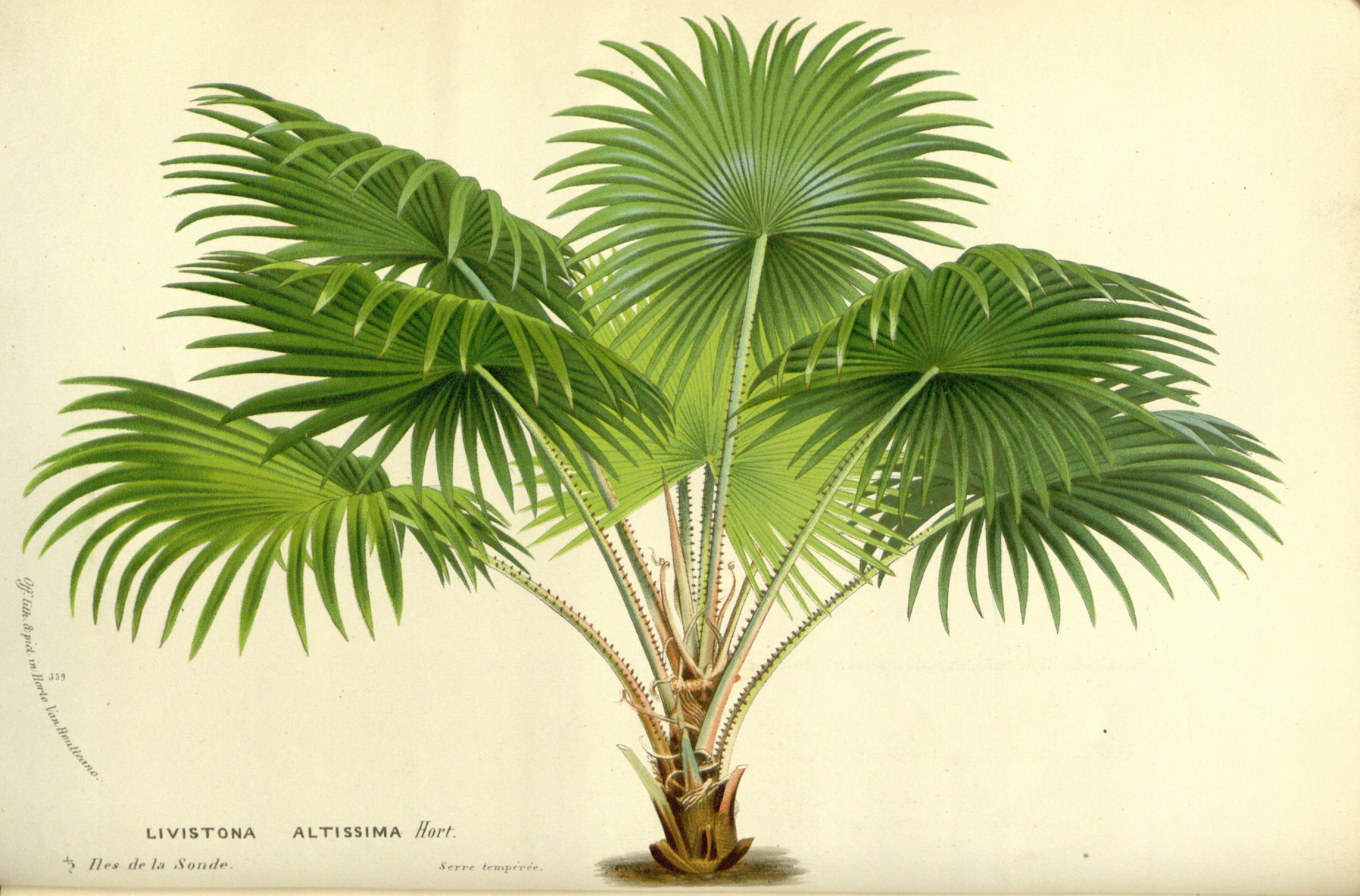

Scientific classification
- Kingdom: Plantae
- Clade: Tracheophytes
- Clade: Angiosperms
- Clade: Monocots
- Clade: Commelinids
- Order: Arecales
- Family: Arecaceae
- Subfamily: Coryphoideae
- Tribe: Trachycarpeae
- Genus: Saribus; Blume

Synonyms
- Pritchardiopsis Becc.

= Saribus =

Genus of palms

Saribus is a genus of palms (family Arecaceae), native to Southeast Asia, Papuasia and Pacific Islands. They are fan palms, the leaves with an armed petiole terminating in a rounded, costapalmate fan of numerous leaflets.

Livistona is closely related to the genus Saribus, and for the past century and half Saribus was included in Livistona. Recent studies, however, have advocated separating the two groups. The generic epithet Saribus comes from a local name in one of the Maluku languages, sariboe, as recorded by the Dutch.

Anáhaw (Saribus rotundifolius) is the unofficial national leaf of the Philippines.

== Species ==
- Saribus brevifolius (Dowe & Mogea) C.D.Bacon & W.J.Baker - Raja Ampat Islands in Indonesia
- Saribus chocolatinus (Dowe) C.D.Bacon & W.J.Baker - Papua New Guinea
- Saribus jeanneneyi (Becc.) C.D.Bacon & W.J.Baker - New Caledonia
- Saribus merrillii (Becc.) C.D.Bacon & W.J.Baker - Philippines
- Saribus papuanus (Becc.) Kuntze - Western New Guinea
- Saribus rotundifolius (Lam.) Mart. - Philippines, Sulawesi, Maluku, Raja Ampat Islands, Banggi Island in north-east Sabah
- Saribus surru (Dowe & Barfod) C.D.Bacon & W.J.Baker - Papua New Guinea
- Saribus tothur (Dowe & Barfod) C.D.Bacon & W.J.Baker - New Guinea
- Saribus woodfordii (Ridl.) C.D.Bacon & W.J.Baker - Papua New Guinea, Solomon Islands
