= Saribus jeanneneyi =

Conservation status
- Critically Endangered (IUCN 3.1)

Scientific classification
- Kingdom: Plantae
- Clade: Tracheophytes
- Clade: Angiosperms
- Clade: Monocots
- Clade: Commelinids
- Order: Arecales
- Family: Arecaceae
- Tribe: Trachycarpeae
- Genus: Saribus
- Species: S. jeanneneyi

Binomial name
- Saribus jeanneneyi (Becc.) C.D.Bacon & W.J.Baker

Synonyms
- Pritchardiopsis jeanneneyi Becc.

Species of palm tree

Saribus jeanneneyi is a very rare species of palm tree in the genus Saribus. It is endemic to southern New Caledonia, where only one mature specimen, surrounded by a few seedlings, survived in its native habitat as of 1997. The cause of its rarity in the wild is because its meristem is edible.

== Taxonomy ==
In 1910 Saribus jeanneneyi was first described as a new species by the Italian palm specialist Odoardo Beccari. He placed it in the genus Pritchardiopsis, but phylogenetic studies based on DNA led to its transfer into Saribus in 2011. The specific epithet commemorates Ambroise Jeanneney, an agronomist in New Caledonia, who collected the holotype specimen in Prony District. The holotype is housed at the herbarium at the Royal Botanic Gardens, Kew.

== Description ==
The fruit are some 4 cm (1.6 in) in diameter. Compared to other species of Saribus, S. jeanneneyi has relatively large fruit, although it shares this characteristic with S. surru and S. tothur. Its fruit are reported to be purplish when ripe, but near-ripe fruit have been photographed with a yellow-orange colour. The seeds are surrounded by a keeled, woody endocarp; S. papuanus likewise has a thickened endocarp.

== Distribution ==
Compared to the other palms in the genus Saribus, S. jeanneneyi has an outlying distribution far to the east of the other species. It is endemic to southern New Caledonia.

== Ecology ==
It grows on a steep slope on serpentine soils at 200 metres (660 ft) elevation.
