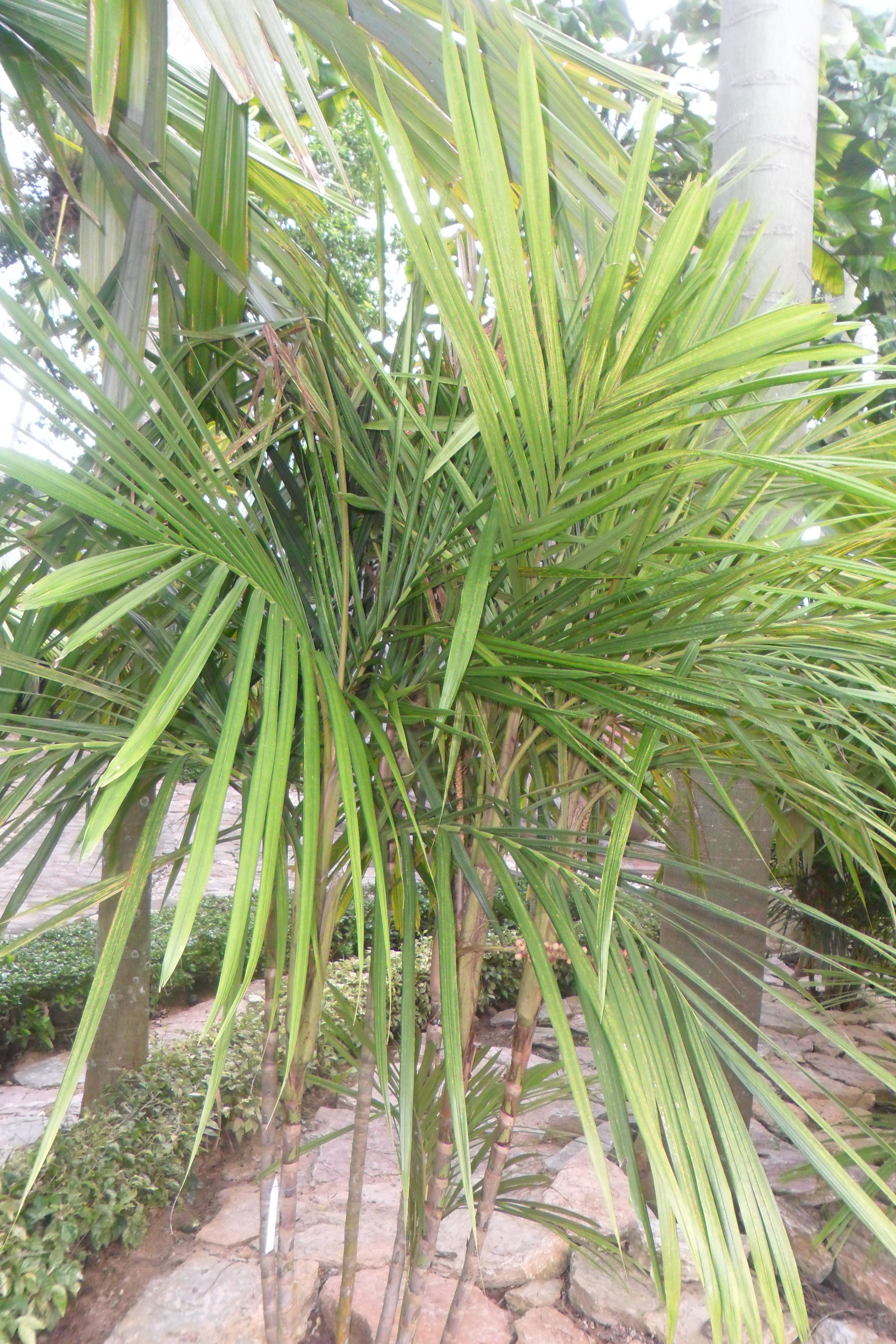

Scientific classification
- Kingdom: Plantae
- Clade: Tracheophytes
- Clade: Angiosperms
- Clade: Monocots
- Clade: Commelinids
- Order: Arecales
- Family: Arecaceae
- Genus: Calyptrocalyx
- Species: C. elegans

Binomial name
- Calyptrocalyx elegans Becc., 1889

= Calyptrocalyx elegans =

Species of palm

Calyptrocalyx elegans is a palm species in the genus Calyptrocalyx found in Papua New Guinea and the nearby Maluku Islands.
