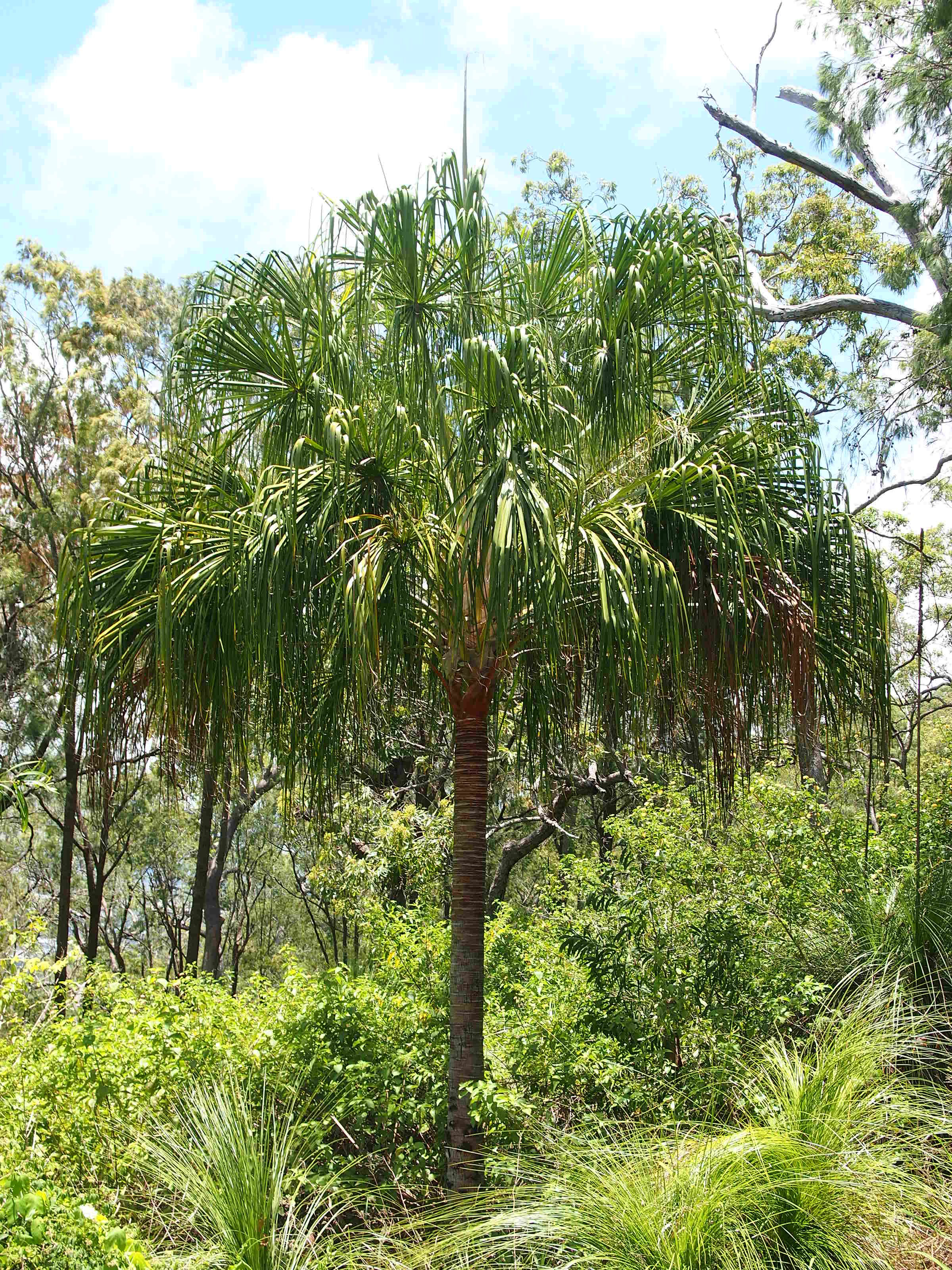

Scientific classification
- Kingdom: Plantae
- Clade: Tracheophytes
- Clade: Angiosperms
- Clade: Monocots
- Clade: Commelinids
- Order: Arecales
- Family: Arecaceae
- Tribe: Trachycarpeae
- Genus: Livistona
- Species: L. decora

Binomial name
- Livistona decora (W. Bull) Dowe

Synonyms
- Corypha decora W.Bull; Livistona decipiens Becc.; Livistona decipiens var. polyantha Becc.

= Livistona decora =

Species of palm

Livistona decora is a species of palm endemic to the sclerophyll woodlands, rainforests, and coastal strands of Queensland, Australia. It is known only from Magnetic Island near the City of Townsville, and south along the coast as far as Rainbow Beach. The species is now widely cultivated in arid regions worldwide as a decorative plant.

== Appearance ==
Livistona decora is up to 18 m tall. Leaves are costapalmate with petioles up to 300 long, with black spines along the margins. Inflorescences are up to 350 cm long, producing shiny black fruits up to 20 mm in diameter.

In the south of the plant's range, it can be confused with the australian fan palm, due to similar appearance and habitat. It can be distinguished by the fact that the trunk is typically smoother, and the frond ends have a habit of drooping.

== Habitat ==
The palm inhabits a variety of habitats, from sclerophyll forests, rainforests, and dunes by the beach. In rainforests, It can be found alongside Breynia oblongifolia, Malaisia scandens, Melaleuca quinquernervia, and various eucalypt species.

In dune environments, it can be accompanied by various species such as Ipomoea pes-caprae, and Spinifex sericeus. Opuntia stricta is found throughout its range.

== Care ==
It can be grown in warm environments worldwide. In the United States, it can be grown in the warmer parts of Texas, Florida, and California. It is hardy to -6.5 °C (20 °F)
