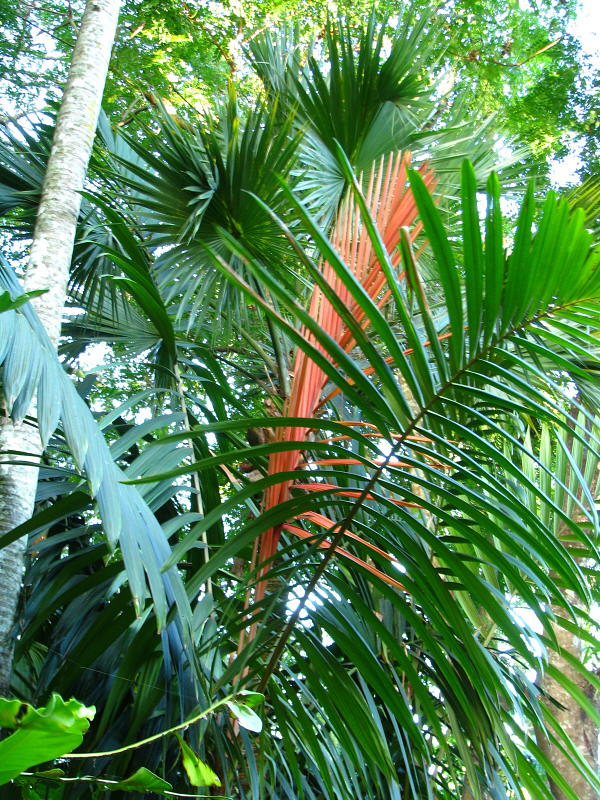
- Calyptrocalyx albertisiana

Scientific classification
- Kingdom: Plantae
- Clade: Tracheophytes
- Clade: Angiosperms
- Clade: Monocots
- Clade: Commelinids
- Order: Arecales
- Family: Arecaceae
- Subfamily: Arecoideae
- Tribe: Areceae
- Subtribe: Linospadicinae
- Genus: Calyptrocalyx; Blume

Type species
- Calyptrocalyx spicata Lam.

Species
- See text

Synonyms
- Linospadix Becc. ex Hook.f. nom. illeg.; Paralinospadix Burret

= Calyptrocalyx =

Genus of palms

Calyptrocalyx is a genus of plants in the palm family Arecaceae, native to New Guinea and the nearby Maluku Islands. Ranging from small to large, the palms in this genus are increasingly found in cultivation owing largely to their purple, red, and orange colored, new foliage. At least 26 species have been described while others, known only by local names, have not yet received a taxonomic account. Palms formerly classified within Paralinospadix have been incorporated into this genus. It is named from two Greek words meaning 'covered' and 'calyx'.

== Description ==
Most Calyptrocalyx species are clustering while a few grow from solitary trunks, all being conspicuously ringed by leaf scars. Trunk diameters range from 1 cm in C. arfakiensis to 25 cm in C. spicatus, spanning heights of 1 to 12 m. The leaves may be pinnate, bifid, or undivided on adaxially channeled, abaxially rounded petioles. While the foliage of these palms matures to various shades of green it is often brightly colored when emergent.

The inflorescence is usually an unbranched, interfoliar spike with unisexual flowers of both sexes; both pistillate and staminate flowers have three sepals and three petals. The fruit produced by Calyptrocalyx species is usually orange or red in color when mature, each containing one seed.

== Distribution and habitat ==
All of these palms are found in New Guinea except C. spicatus which grows in the Maluku Islands. They are all undergrowth inhabitants of rainforests from sea level up to 1000 m, often on mountain slopes and occasionally alongside streams and in swamps.

== Cultivation ==
Commonly cultivated for their colorful new leaves, these palms are not hardy to cold and require protection from freezing temperatures. They prefer a quickly draining, humus-rich soil and shade or filtered light when young, though some will adapt to full sun as they mature. They also require protection from cold, dry winds which easily damage or kill them.

== Species ==
As of February 2025, Plants of the World Online accepts the following 28 species:

- Calyptrocalyx albertisianus Becc.
- Calyptrocalyx amoenus Dowe & M.D.Ferrero
- Calyptrocalyx arfakianus (Becc.) Dowe & M.D.Ferrero
- Calyptrocalyx awa Dowe & M.D.Ferrero
- Calyptrocalyx calcicola J.Dransf. & L.T.Sm.
- Calyptrocalyx caudiculatus (Becc.) Dowe & M.D.Ferrero
- Calyptrocalyx doxanthus Dowe & M.D.Ferrero
- Calyptrocalyx elegans Becc.
- Calyptrocalyx flabellatus (Becc.) Dowe & M.D.Ferrero
- Calyptrocalyx forbesii (Ridl.) Dowe & M.D.Ferrero
- Calyptrocalyx geonomiformis (Becc.) Dowe & M.D.Ferrero
- Calyptrocalyx hollrungii (Becc.) Dowe & M.D.Ferrero
- Calyptrocalyx julianettii (Becc.) Dowe & M.D.Ferrero
- Calyptrocalyx lauterbachianus Becc.
- Calyptrocalyx laxiflorus Becc.
- Calyptrocalyx lepidotus (Burret) Dowe & M.D.Ferrero
- Calyptrocalyx leptostachys Becc.
- Calyptrocalyx merrillianus (Burret) Dowe & M.D.Ferrero
- Calyptrocalyx micholitzii (Ridl.) Dowe & M.D.Ferrero
- Calyptrocalyx multifidus (Becc.) Dowe & M.D.Ferrero
- Calyptrocalyx pachystachys Becc.
- Calyptrocalyx pauciflorus Becc.
- Calyptrocalyx polyphyllus Becc.
- Calyptrocalyx pusillus (Becc.) Dowe & M.D.Ferrero
- Calyptrocalyx reflexus J.Dransf. & Marcus
- Calyptrocalyx sessiliflorus Dowe & M.D.Ferrero
- Calyptrocalyx spicatus (Lam.) Blume
- Calyptrocalyx yamutumene Dowe & M.D.Ferrero

== Gallery ==
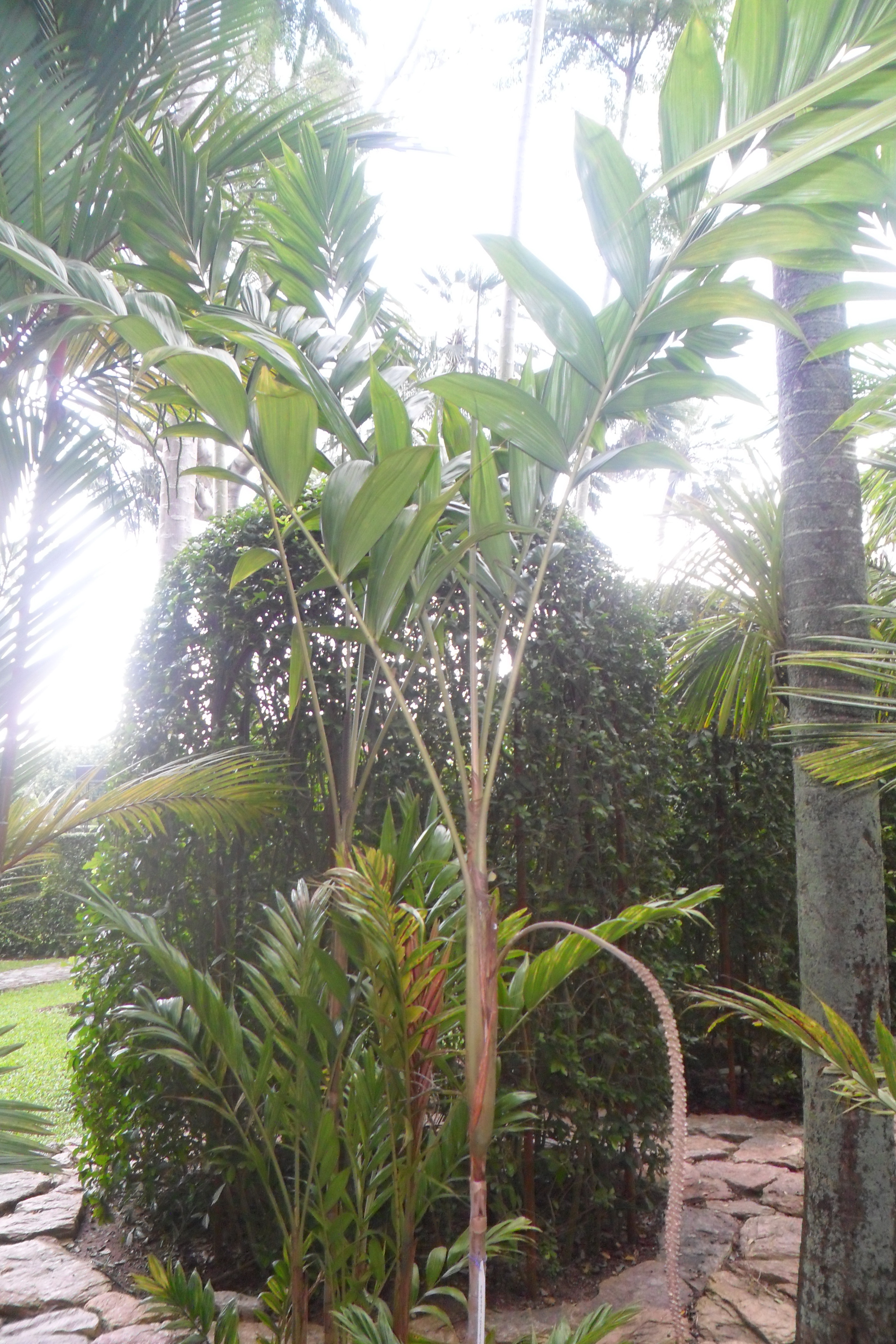
Calyptrocalyx polyphyllus

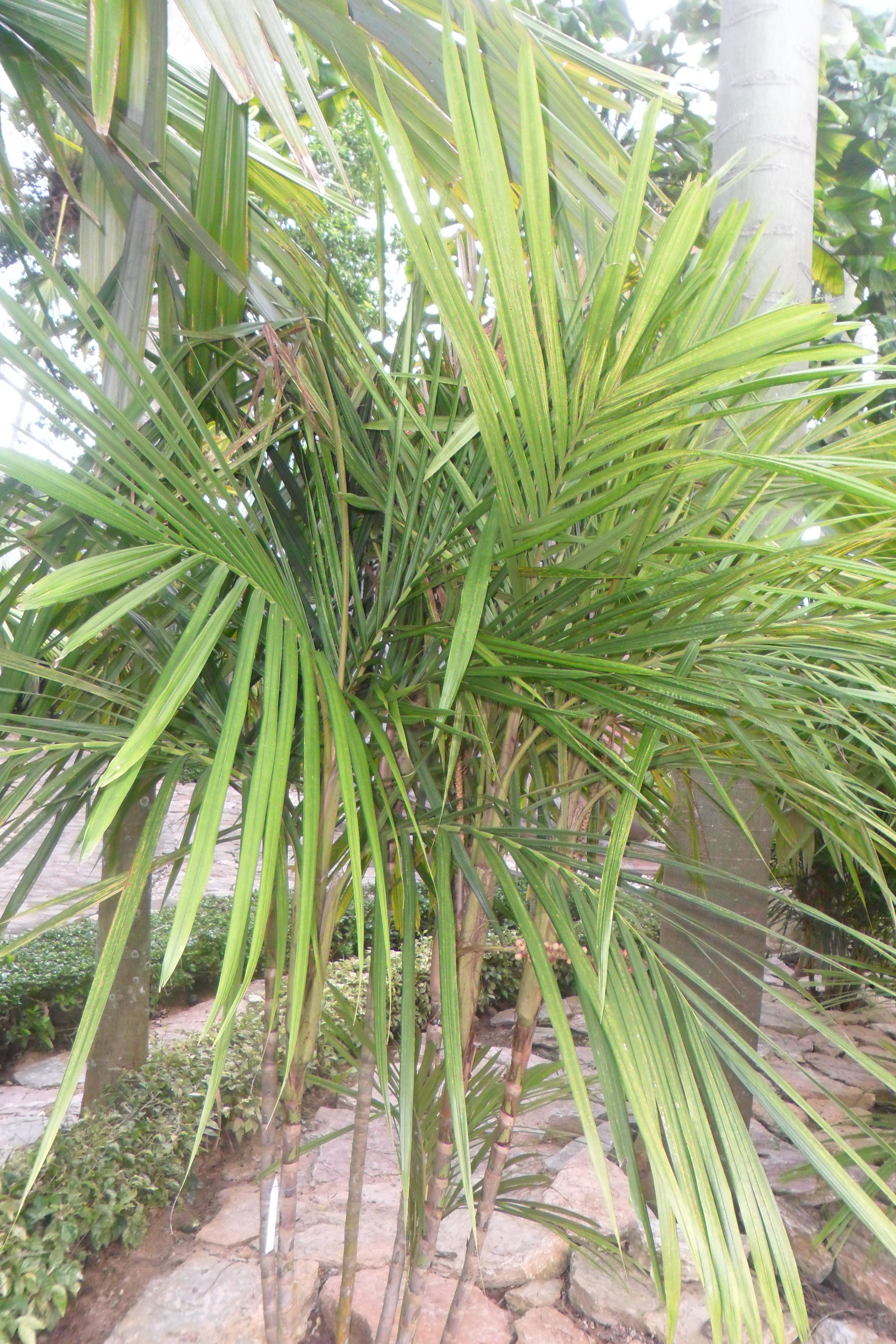
Calyptrocalyx elegans

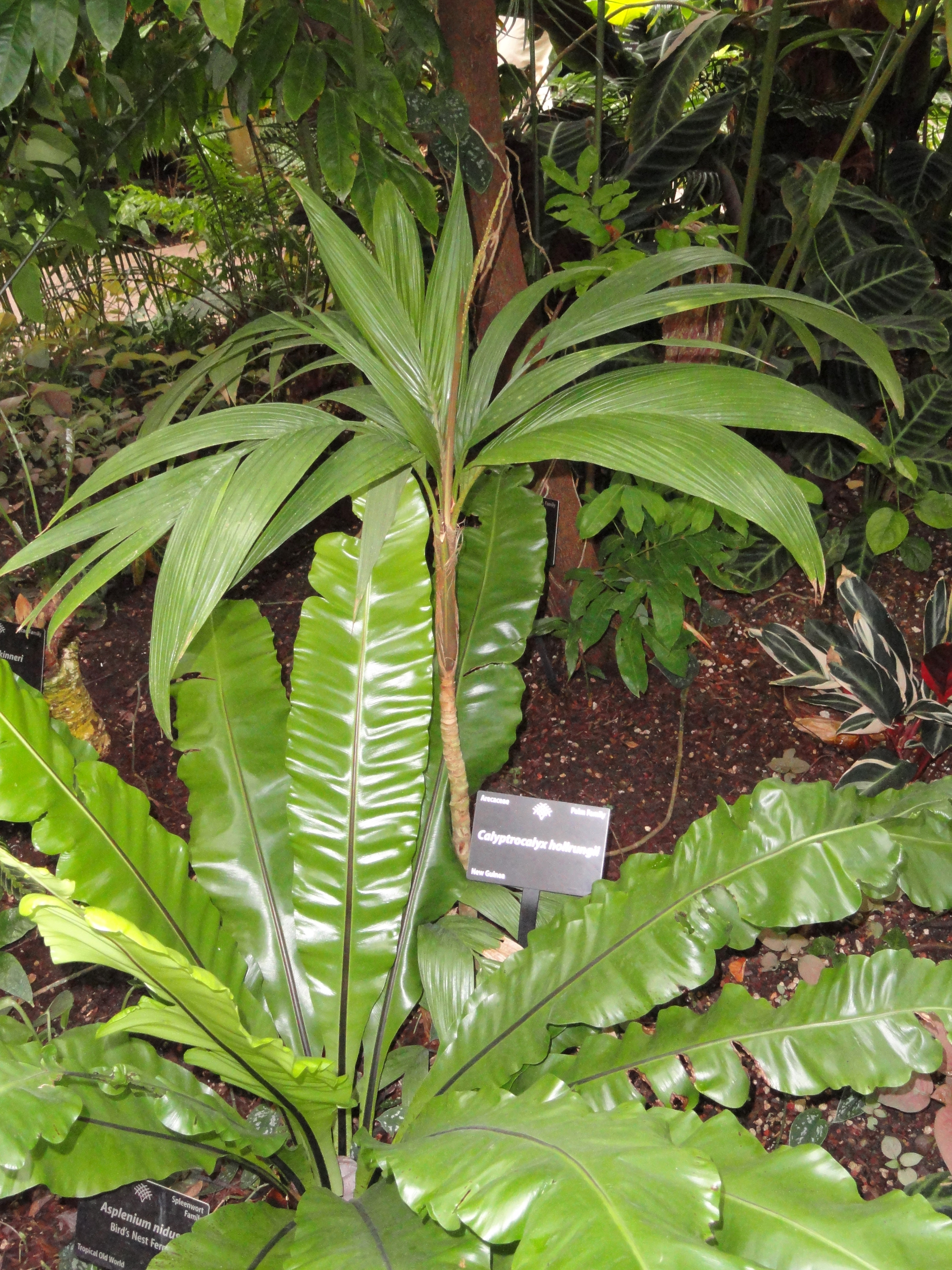
Calyptrocalyx hollrungii
