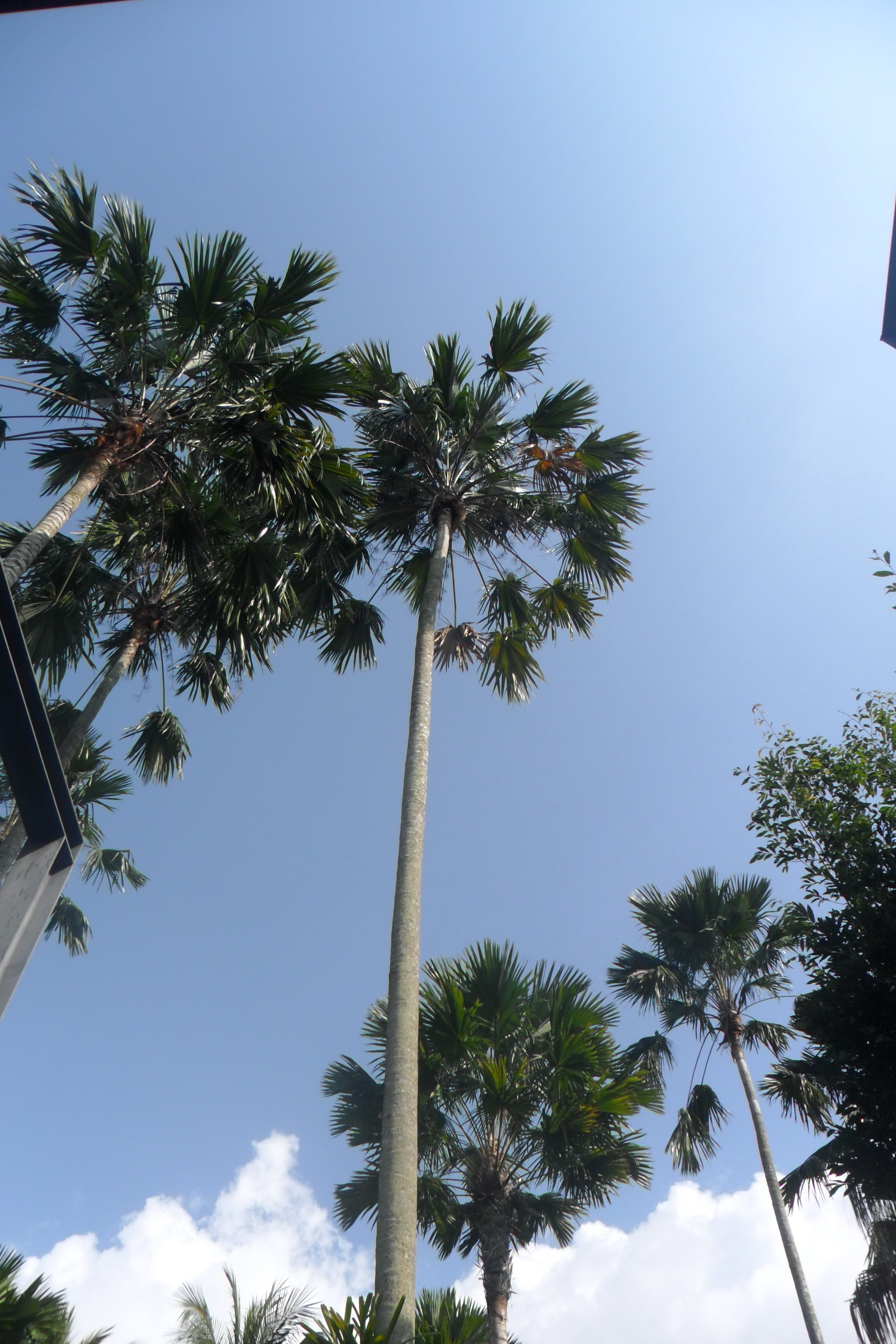
- Saribus rotundifolius at the Nong Nooch Tropical Garden, Thailand

Scientific classification
- Kingdom: Plantae
- Clade: Tracheophytes
- Clade: Angiosperms
- Clade: Monocots
- Clade: Commelinids
- Order: Arecales
- Family: Arecaceae
- Tribe: Trachycarpeae
- Genus: Saribus
- Species: S. rotundifolius

Binomial name
- Saribus rotundifolius (Lam.) Blume

Synonyms
- Corypha rotundifolia Lam.; Licuala rotundifolia (Lam.) Blume; Livistona altissima Zoll.; Livistona microcarpa Becc.; Livistona mindorensis Becc.; Livistona robinsoniana Becc.; Livistona rotundifolia (Lam.) Mart.

= Saribus rotundifolius =

Species of palm

Saribus rotundifolius, also known as the footstool palm, is a common fan palm found in Southeast Asia. It is a member of the genus Saribus.

== Common names ==
It is called anáhaw or luyong in Filipino. In Malay the palm is known as serdang daun bulat.

== Taxonomy ==
Saribus rotundifolius was first described as Corypha rotundifolia by the French Jean-Baptiste Lamarck in 1786. It was moved to the Saribus genus by the German-Dutch botanist Carl Ludwig Blume in a publication issued in 1838 or 1839. This move was generally not accepted by others in the field. In 2011, after DNA research, the reclassification from the Livistona genus to the resurrected genus Saribus was official. The generic epithet Saribus comes from a local name in one of the Maluku languages, as recorded by the Dutch, sariboe. The specific epithet means 'round-leaved' in Latin.

== Description ==
Saribus rotundifolius is a hermaphrodite fan palm. The palm is evergreen, erect, and only grows having a single trunk ('solitary'). It grows at a height ranging from 15 to 25 metres, exceptionally up to 45 metres tall, and thickness of 15 to 25 cm diameter at breast height. Its trunk is smooth and straight with a shallow rings of leaf scars. The trunk is rather massive and tapering. It usually grows to 60 feet (18 m) tall, but may rarely reach 90 feet (27 m) tall. The young trees have a green crown. This species is seldom seen with a slight skirt of drooping, dead leaves. The sheaths are chestnut brown in colour.

The palmately-lobed leaves are spirally arranged around the trunk. The petioles are long. The entire leaf is some 1.2 metres in length. The leaf blade is entire in its centre, and almost round in outline. It is regularly divided to about half of the length and 1.2 metres in diameter. The leaf segments are forked, but not deeply, at their ends. The leaf segments have one main nerve.

The flowers are borne on an inflorescence with a long peduncle, about 0.9 to 1.2 metres long. The three-petalled flowers appear in bunches.

The fruit is a fleshy drupe. It is about 2cm in diameter, quite round, and coloured brick red as it ripens, ultimately becoming black when ripe.

== Distribution ==
The palm is native to Sulawesi and the Maluku Islands in Indonesia, and the Philippines. The native distribution stretches from Banggi Island in Sabah, Malaysia, off the north-east coastal tip of Borneo in the west, to the Raja Ampat Islands near Maluku off the north-west tip of Bird's Head Peninsula in Indonesia's West Papua province in the east. Its northernmost native distribution is in the Philippines. It is abundant throughout the Philippines. It has been introduced into the wild in Java, the Lesser Sunda islands, Peninsular Malaysia and Trinidad and Tobago. It has also been introduced to India.

On Java it occurs in the west and the central-eastern parts of the island. It is usually found as a cultivated plant, but already in the 1960s in some places it has escaped into the wild, becoming locally very numerous.

== Ecology ==
The lepidopteran caterpillars of the species Suastus gremius and Elymnias hypermnestra have been recorded using Saribus rotundifolius as a host plant. The tree only flowers after it becomes very old. Its flowers are pollinated by bees.

== Uses ==
Saribus rotundifolius can be grown in humid, tropical areas. It is a common landscaping plant in the Philippines, and has been widely cultivated in Peninsular Malaysia, Singapore, Java and elsewhere, for a long time. The fruit are quite attractive. It is cultivated as an ornamental throughout Colombia.

The leaves are used for the thatching of roofs and wrapping food. Overharvesting of the leaves of plants causes a reduction in leaf size. The leaves do grow faster after harvest but tend to be smaller.

The foliage of the Saribus rotundifolius is the unofficial national leaf of the Philippines.

== Gallery ==
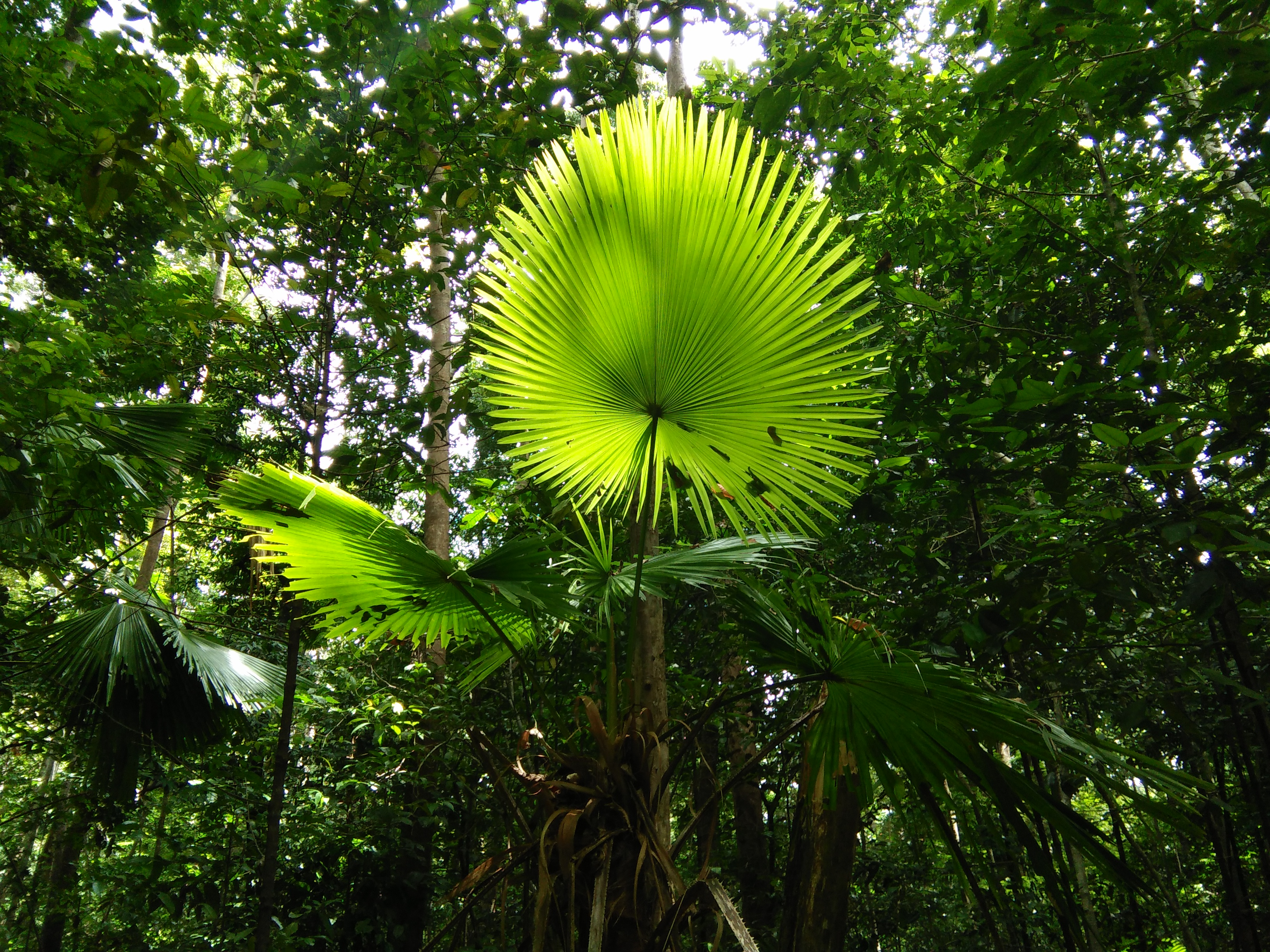
Saribus rotundifolius palm in the forest understory in Tangkoko Nature Reserve, Sulawesi

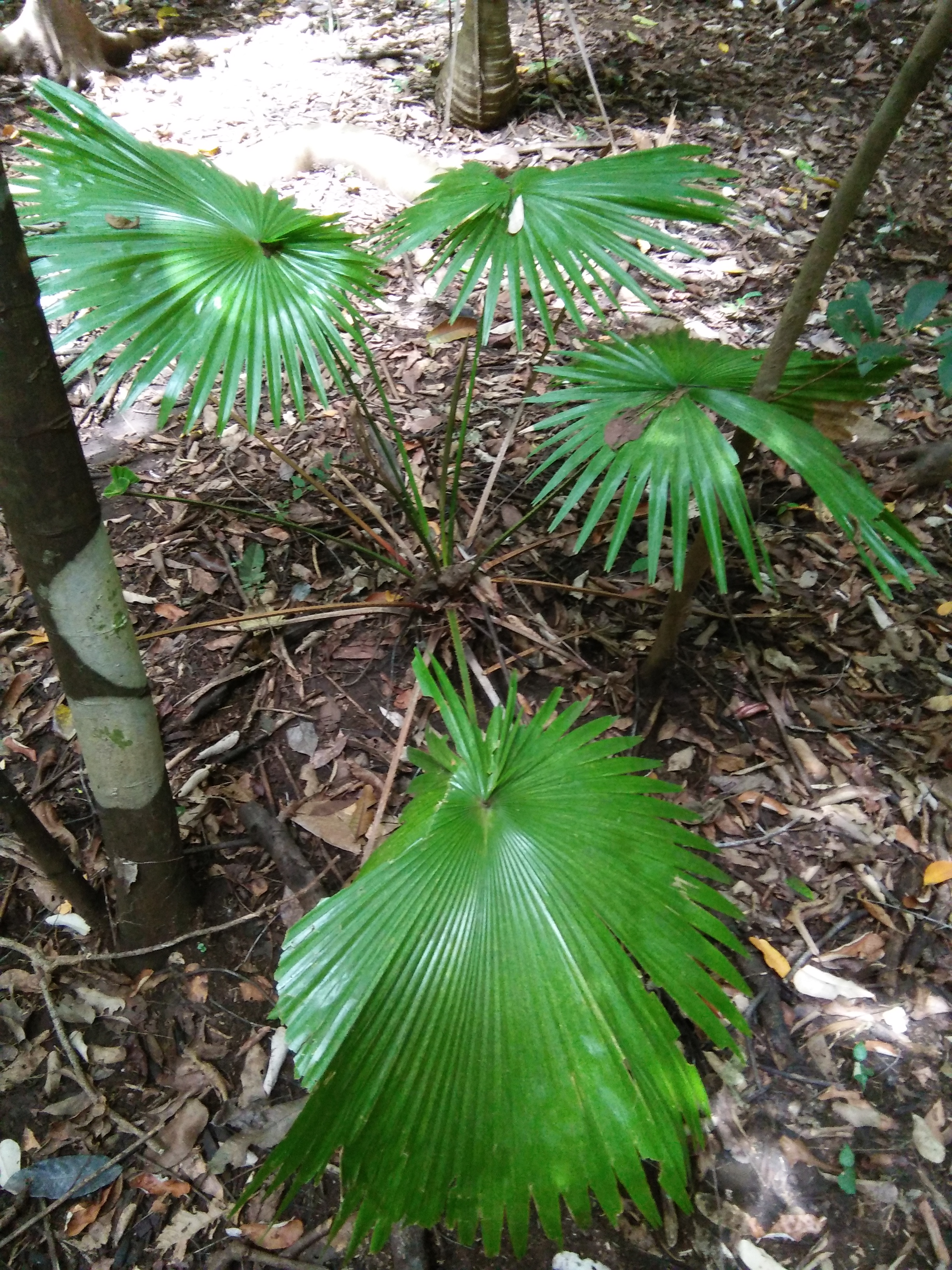
Saribus rotundifolius in situ in Tangkoko Nature Reserve, Sulawesi

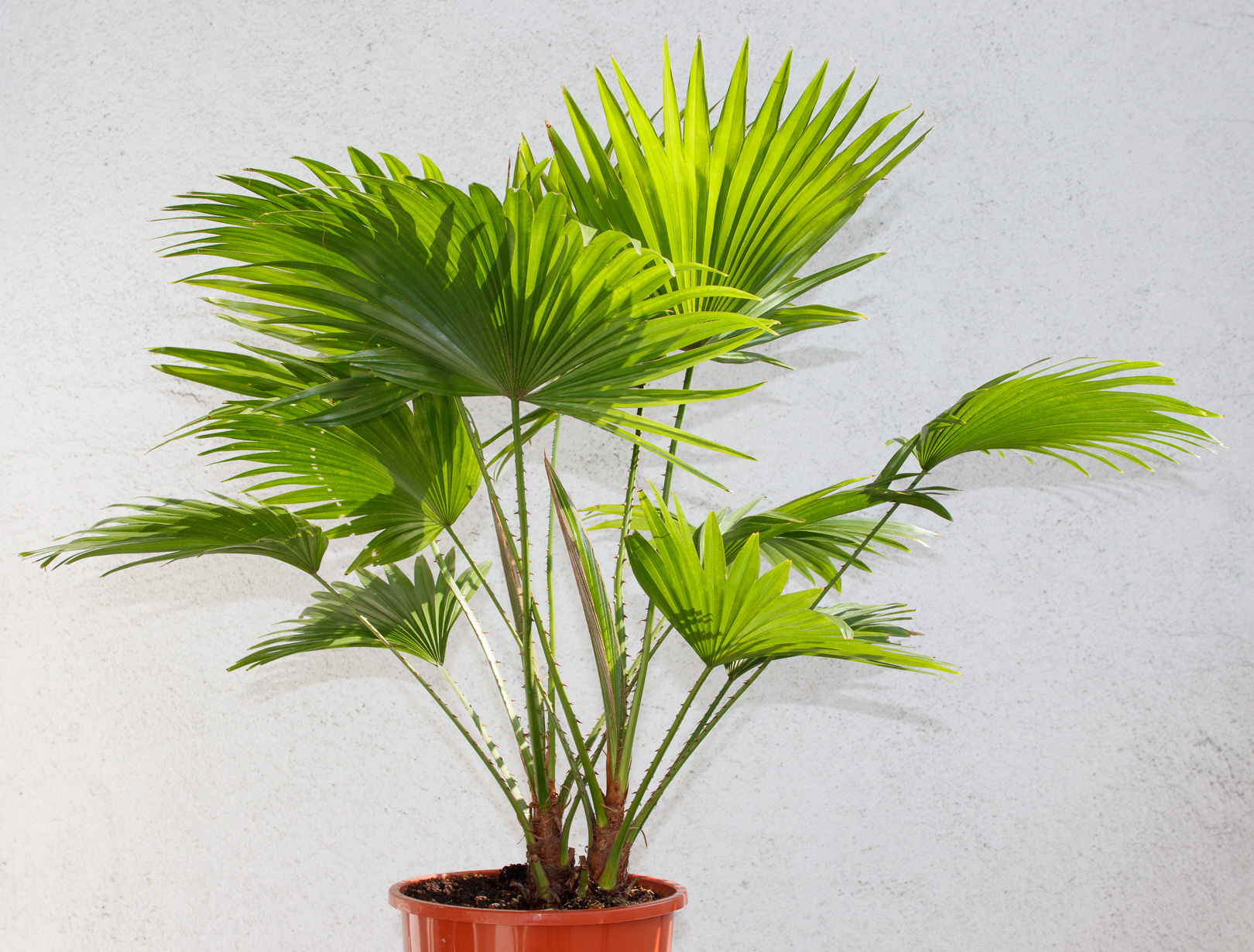
Saribus rotundifolius in a pot

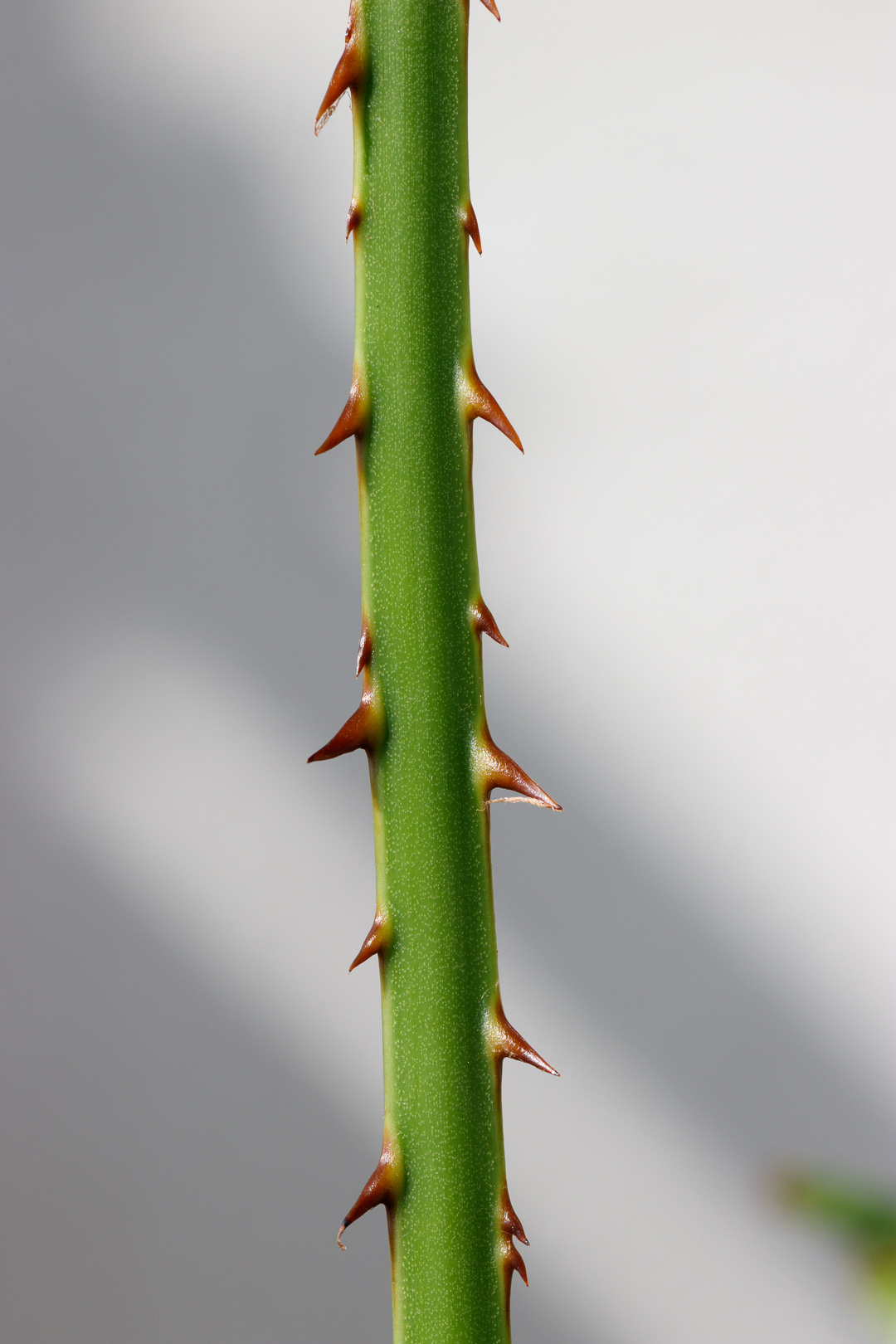
Spines on margins of the petiole of a young plant of Saribus rotundifolius

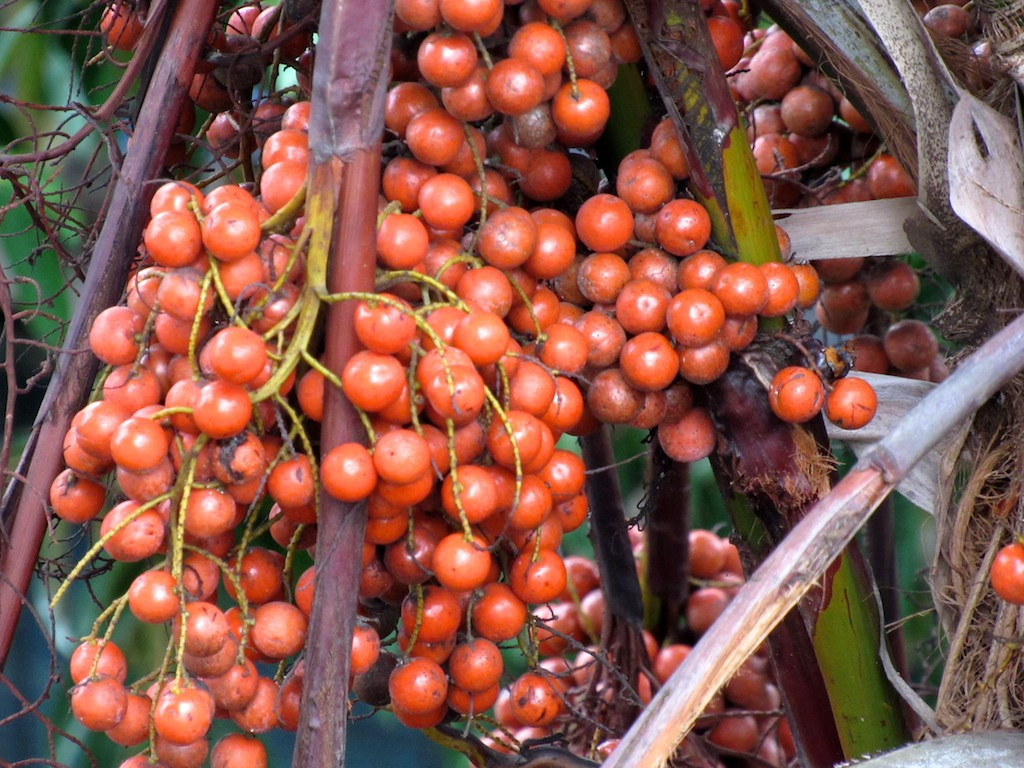
Saribus rotundifolius developing fruit

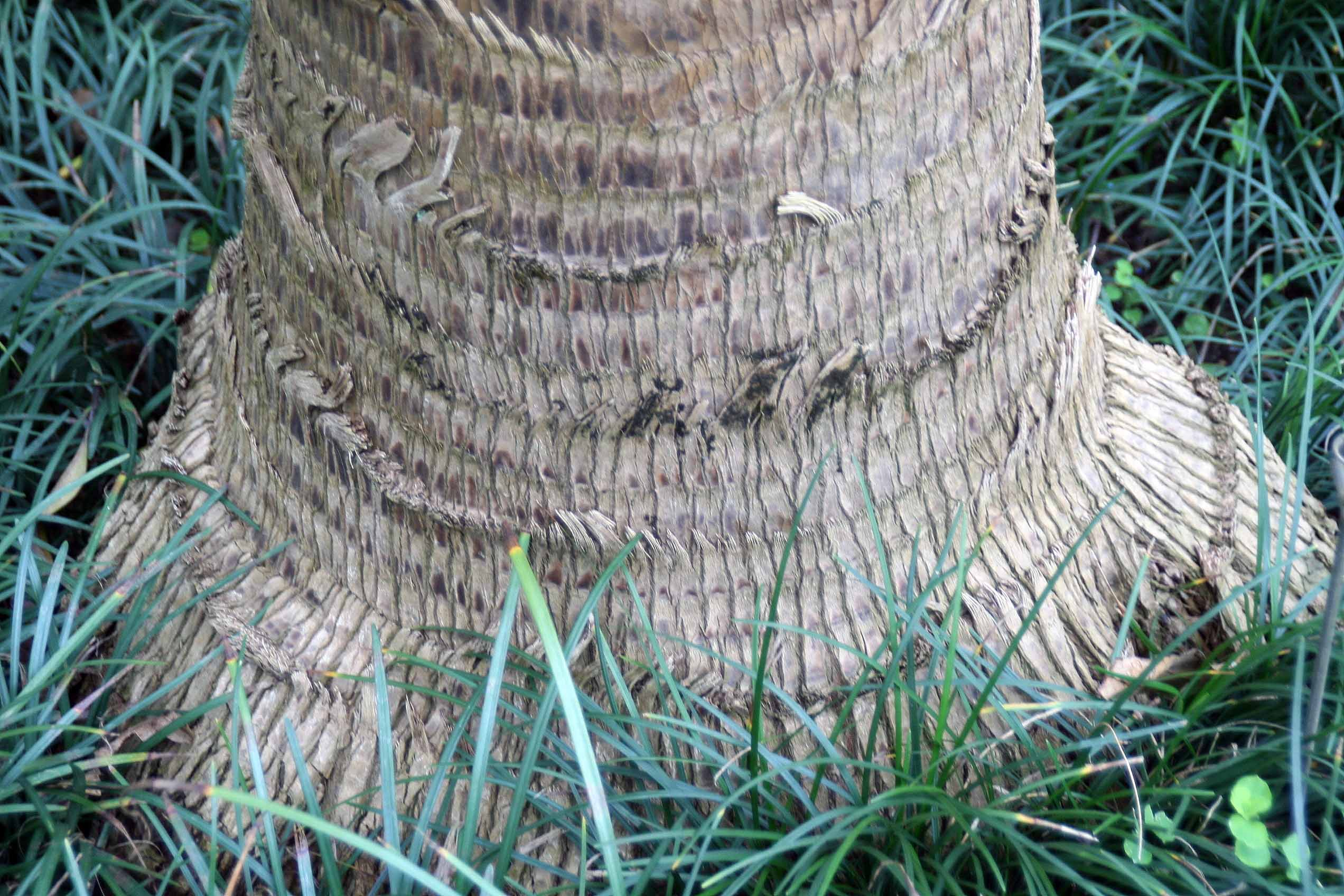
Base of the trunk in Fairchild Tropical Botanic Garden, Miami

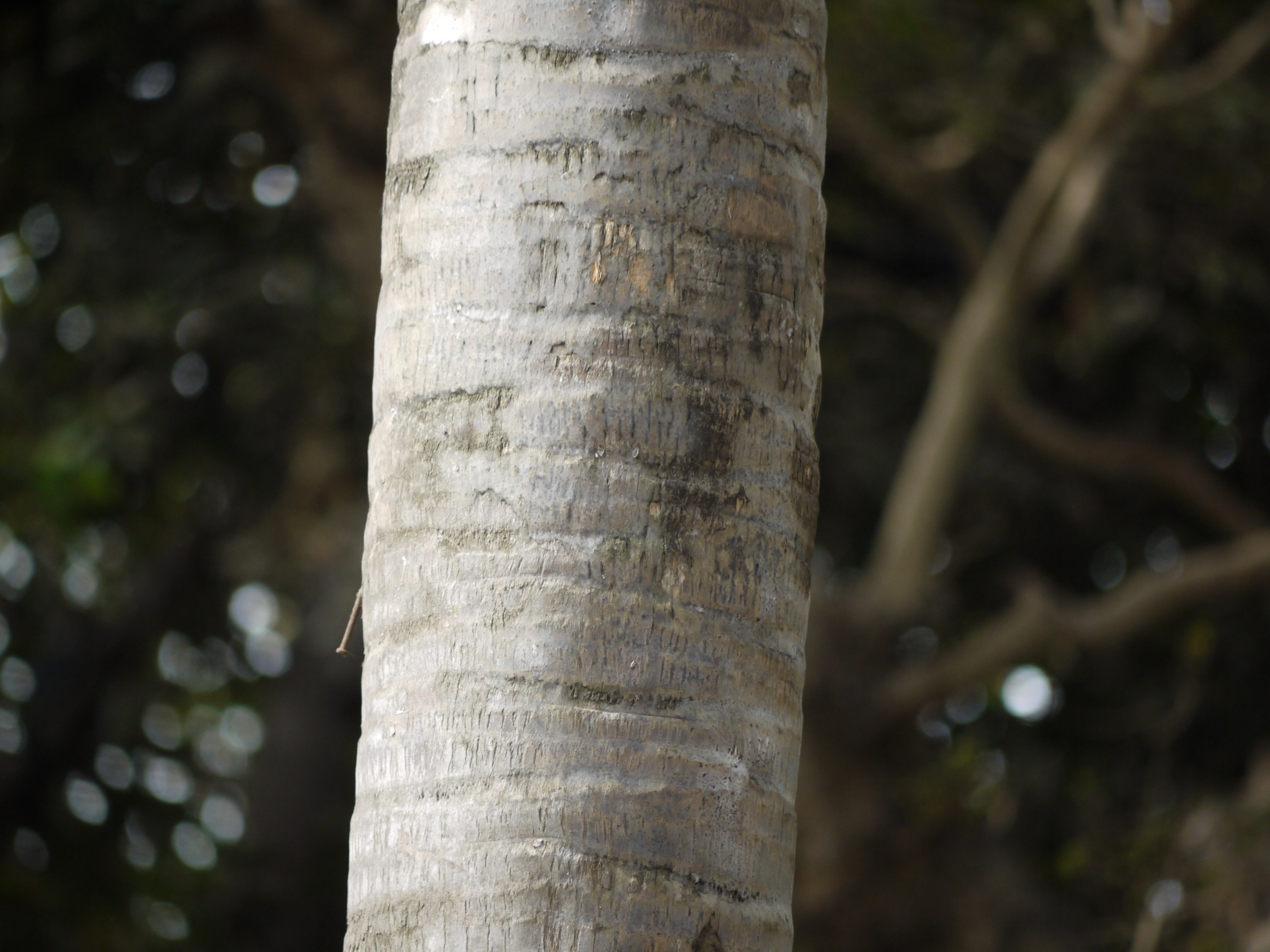
Trunk showing leaf scars in India

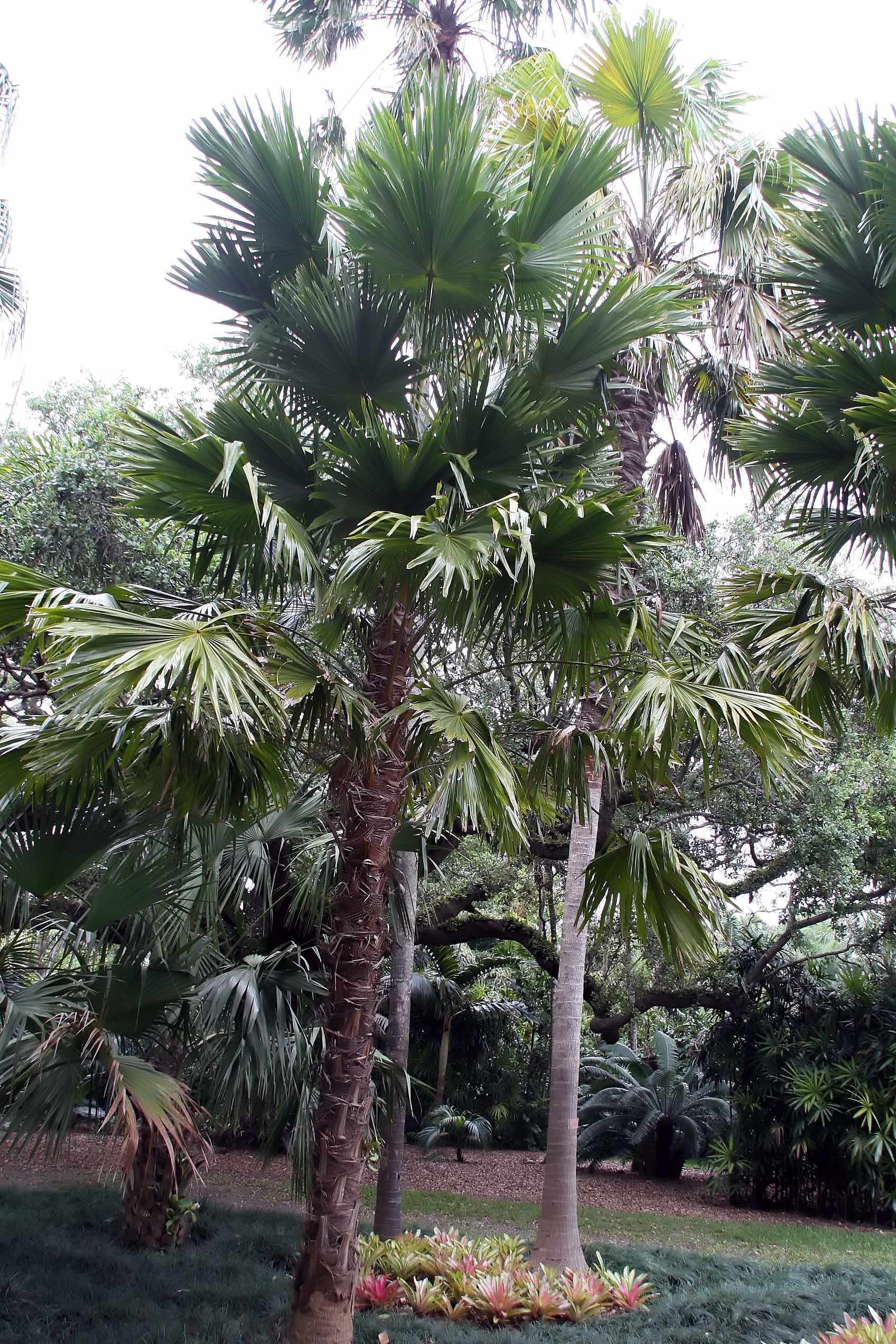
However, the trunk is covered in persistent leaf bases for a long time

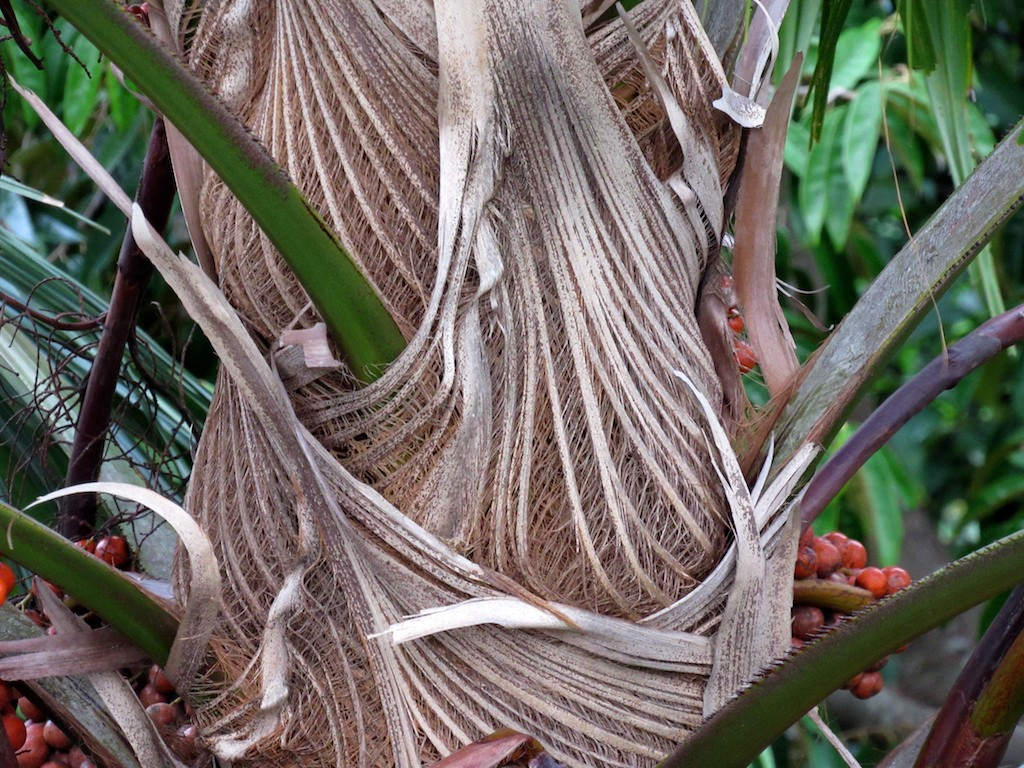
The disintegrating frond bases on the trunk of the palm

== Conservation ==
This plant species is common and has been classed as 'least concern'.
