= Michael D. Ferrero =

Australian botanist

- Born: 1968 (age 57–58)
- Scientific career
- Fields: Botany, Arecaceae
- Workplaces: Nong Nooch Tropical Garden; James Cook University
- Author abbrev. (botany): M.D.Ferrero

Michael D. Ferrero (born 1968) is a botanist who specialises in the systematics and ecology of the Arecaceae, with emphasis on the genera, Calyptrocalyx, Gronophyllum, Hydriastele and has described more than 20 new species of palms. He has collected in Indo China, Thailand, Australasia and Papua New Guinea,

The standard author abbreviation M.D.Ferrero is used to indicate this person as the author when citing a botanical name.

== Some publications ==
- Dowe, J.L. & Ferrero, M.D. (2000) Gronophyllum cariosum, an Ornamental New Species from Papua New Guinea, Palms 2000 Vol.44 No.4 pp. 161–165. ISSN 1523-4495
- Dowe, J.L. & Ferrero, M.D. (2001) Revision of Calyptrocalyx and the New Guinea species of Linospadix (Linospadicinae: Arecoideae: Arecaceae) Blumea 46: 207-251 ISSN 0006-5196
- Dowe, J.L. & Ferrero, M.D. (2000) A new species of rheophytic palm from New Guinea. Palms, 44 (4). pp. 194–197.
