= John Leslie Dowe =

Australian botanist

- Citizenship: Australia
- Scientific career
- Fields: Botany Palms
- Author abbrev. (botany): Dowe

John Leslie Dowe is an Australian botanist who specialises in palms.

The standard author abbreviation Dowe is used to indicate this person as the author when citing a botanical name.

== Published names (selected) ==
- Archontophoenix maxima Dowe (1994) Austrobaileya 4(2): 235.
- Balaka streptostachys D.Fuller & Dowe (1999) Palms 43(1): 10.
- Livistona decora (W.Bull) Dowe (2004) Austrobaileya 6: 979.
- Calyptrocalyx hollrungii (Becc.) Dowe & M.D.Ferrero (2001) Blumea 46(2): 226.

(A complete list may be found at IPNI.)

== Publications (selected) ==
- Dowe, J.L. (2016) Charles Weldon (de Burgh) Birch (Count Zelling), an unassuming botanical and zoological collector in central and north-eastern Queensland. North Queensland Naturalist 46
- Dowe, J.L. (2016) ODOARDO BECCARI AND ENRICO D’ALBERTIS IN AUSTRALIA AND NEW ZEALAND, 1878: BOTANICAL AND ZOOLOGICAL COLLECTIONS. Papers and Proceedings of the Royal Society of Tasmania 150, 27-41.
- Dowe, J.L. (2017) Baron Ferdinand von Mueller, the "Princeps of Australian Botany", and a Historical Account of his Australasian Palms. Palms 61,
- Dowe, J.L.; Maroske, S. (2016). "'These Princely Plants': Ferdinand Mueller and the Naming of Australasian Palms". Historical Records of Australian Science. 27 (1): 13. doi:10.1071/HR15014. ISSN 0727-3061.
- Dowe, J.L. (2018). "'Such Superfluity of Genera': Ferdinand Mueller's Criticism of Generic Limits in Wendland and Drude's 'Palmae Australasicae' of 1875". Historical Records of Australian Science. 29 (2): 82. doi:10.1071/HR17025. ISSN 0727-3061.
- See also: James Cook University: Research online - some publications of John L. Dowe
