= Paraboea =

Scientific classification
- Kingdom: Plantae
- Clade: Embryophytes
- Clade: Tracheophytes
- Clade: Spermatophytes
- Clade: Angiosperms
- Clade: Eudicots
- Clade: Asterids
- Order: Lamiales
- Family: Gesneriaceae
- Subfamily: Didymocarpoideae
- Genus: Paraboea (C.B.Clarke) Ridl.

Species
- See text

Synonyms
- Buxiphyllum W.T.Wang & C.Z.Gao; Chlamydoboea Stapf; Dichiloboea Stapf; Phylloboea Benth.; Trisepalum C.B.Clarke

Genus of flowering plants

Paraboea are a genus of flowering plants in the African violet family Gesneriaceae, native to southern China (including Taiwan and Hainan), Assam, Indochina, and Malesia. They were recircumscribed from Boea in 2016.

== Species ==
Currently accepted species include:

- Paraboea acaulis (Barnett) C.Puglisi
- Paraboea acuta (C.B.Clarke) C.Puglisi
- Paraboea acutifolia (Ridl.) B.L.Burtt
- Paraboea albida (Barnett) C.Puglisi
- Paraboea amplexicaulis (C.S.P.Parish ex C.B.Clarke) C.Puglisi
- Paraboea amplifolia Z.R.Xu & B.L.Burtt
- Paraboea angustifolia Yan Liu & W.B.Xu
- Paraboea apiensis Z.R.Xu
- Paraboea arachnoidea Triboun
- Paraboea argentea Z.R.Xu
- Paraboea axillaris Triboun
- Paraboea babae D.J.Middleton
- Paraboea bakeri M.R.Hend.
- Paraboea banyengiana B.L.Burtt
- Paraboea barnettiae C.Puglisi
- Paraboea berouwensis Z.R.Xu & B.L.Burtt
- Paraboea bhumiboliana Triboun & Chuchan
- Paraboea bintangensis B.L.Burtt
- Paraboea birmanica (Craib) C.Puglisi
- Paraboea brachycarpa (Ridl.) B.L.Burtt
- Paraboea brunnescens B.L.Burtt
- Paraboea burttii Z.R.Xu
- Paraboea caerulescens (Ridl.) B.L.Burtt
- Paraboea candidissima B.L.Burtt
- Paraboea capitata Ridl.
- Paraboea changjiangensis F.W.Xing & Z.X.Li
- Paraboea chiangdaoensis Z.R.Xu & B.L.Burtt
- Paraboea chumphonensis Triboun
- Paraboea clarkei B.L.Burtt
- Paraboea cochinchinensis (C.B.Clarke) B.L.Burtt
- Paraboea connata (Craib) C.Y.Wu
- Paraboea crassifila W.B.Xu & J.Guo
- Paraboea crassifolia (Hemsl.) B.L.Burtt
- Paraboea detergibilis (C.B.Clarke) B.L.Burtt
- Paraboea dictyoneura (Hance) B.L.Burtt
- Paraboea divaricata (Ridl.) B.L.Burtt
- Paraboea doitungensis Triboun & D.J.Middleton
- Paraboea dushanensis W.B.Xu & M.Q.Han
- Paraboea eburnea Triboun
- Paraboea effusa B.L.Burtt
- Paraboea elegans (Ridl.) B.L.Burtt
- Paraboea ferruginea (Ridl.) Ridl.
- Paraboea filipes (Hance) B.L.Burtt
- Paraboea fimbriata C.Puglisi & Phutthai
- Paraboea glabra (Ridl.) B.L.Burtt
- Paraboea glabrescens (Barnett) C.Puglisi
- Paraboea glabriflora (Barnett) B.L.Burtt
- Paraboea glabrisepala B.L.Burtt
- Paraboea glandulifera (Barnett) C.Puglisi
- Paraboea glanduliflora Barnett
- Paraboea glandulosa (B.L.Burtt) C.Puglisi
- Paraboea glutinosa (Hand.-Mazz.) K.Y.Pan
- Paraboea gracillima Kiew
- Paraboea graniticola Z.R.Xu
- Paraboea guilinensis L.Xu & Y.G.Wei
- Paraboea hainanensis (Chun) B.L.Burtt
- Paraboea halongensis Kiew & T.H.Nguyên
- Paraboea harroviana (Craib) Z.R.Xu
- Paraboea havilandii (Ridl.) B.L.Burtt
- Paraboea hekouensis Y.M.Shui & W.H.Chen
- Paraboea incudicarpa B.L.Burtt
- Paraboea insularis Triboun
- Paraboea kalimantanensis Z.R.Xu & B.L.Burtt
- Paraboea lambokensis Kiew
- Paraboea lanata (Ridl.) B.L.Burtt
- Paraboea lancifolia (Ridl.) B.L.Burtt
- Paraboea lavandulodora Triboun
- Paraboea laxa (Ridl.) Ridl.
- Paraboea leopoldii K.M.Wong, J.T.Pereira, Sugau & S.P.Lim
- Paraboea leporina (H.J.Lam) B.L.Burtt
- Paraboea leuserensis B.L.Burtt
- Paraboea longipetiolata (B.L.Burtt) C.Puglisi
- Paraboea luzoniensis Merr.
- Paraboea maculata C.Puglisi
- Paraboea mahaxayana Z.R.Xu & B.L.Burtt
- Paraboea manhaoensis Y.M.Shui & W.H.Chen
- Paraboea martini (H.Lév. & Vaniot) B.L.Burtt
- Paraboea mataensis Z.R.Xu & B.L.Burtt
- Paraboea meiophylla B.L.Burtt
- Paraboea middletonii Triboun
- Paraboea minahassae (Teijsm. & Binn.) B.L.Burtt
- Paraboea minor (Barnett) B.L.Burtt
- Paraboea minuta (Kraenzl.) B.L.Burtt
- Paraboea minutiflora D.J.Middleton
- Paraboea nagalandiana Deb & Ratna Dutta
- Paraboea nana Triboun & Dongkumfu
- Paraboea nervosissima Z.R.Xu & B.L.Burtt
- Paraboea neurophylla (Collett & Hemsl.) B.L.Burtt
- Paraboea nobilis Triboun & D.J.Middleton
- Paraboea nutans D.Fang & D.H.Qin
- Paraboea obtusa (C.B.Clarke) C.Puglisi
- Paraboea paniculata (Ridl.) B.L.Burtt
- Paraboea paramartinii Z.R.Xu & B.L.Burtt
- Paraboea paraprimuloides Z.R.Xu
- Paraboea parviflora (Ridl.) B.L.Burtt
- Paraboea patens (Ridl.) B.L.Burtt
- Paraboea peltifolia D.Fang & L.Zeng
- Paraboea peninsularis Triboun & D.J.Middleton
- Paraboea phanomensis Triboun & D.J.Middleton
- Paraboea prazeri (B.L.Burtt) C.Puglisi
- Paraboea prolixa (C.B.Clarke) B.L.Burtt
- Paraboea pubicorolla Z.R.Xu & B.L.Burtt
- Paraboea puglisiae Triboun & D.J.Middleton
- Paraboea punggulensis Kiew
- Paraboea quercifolia Triboun
- Paraboea rabilii Z.R.Xu & B.L.Burtt
- Paraboea robusta (B.L.Burtt) C.Puglisi
- Paraboea romklaoensis D.J.Middleton & Triboun
- Paraboea rosea Triboun
- Paraboea rufescens (Franch.) B.L.Burtt
- Paraboea sabahensis Z.R.Xu & B.L.Burtt
- Paraboea sangwaniae Triboun
- Paraboea scabriflora B.L.Burtt
- Paraboea schefferi (H.O.Forbes) B.L.Burtt
- Paraboea siamensis Triboun
- Paraboea sinensis (Oliv.) B.L.Burtt
- Paraboea sinovietnamica W.B.Xu & J.Guo
- Paraboea speciosa (Rech.) B.L.Burtt
- Paraboea speluncarum (B.L.Burtt) B.L.Burtt
- Paraboea stellata D.J.Middleton
- Paraboea strobilacea (Barnett) C.Puglisi
- Paraboea subplana (B.L.Burtt) C.Puglisi
- Paraboea suffruticosa (Ridl.) B.L.Burtt
- Paraboea swinhoei (Hance) B.L.Burtt
- Paraboea takensis Triboun
- Paraboea tarutaoensis Z.R.Xu & B.L.Burtt
- Paraboea tenuicalyx Triboun
- Paraboea tetrabracteata F.Wen, Xin Hong & Y.G.Wei
- Paraboea thorelii (Pellegr.) B.L.Burtt
- Paraboea trachyphylla Z.R.Xu & B.L.Burtt
- Paraboea treubii (H.O.Forbes) B.L.Burtt
- Paraboea trisepala W.H.Chen & Y.M.Shui
- Paraboea umbellata (Drake) B.L.Burtt
- Paraboea uniflora Z.R.Xu & B.L.Burtt
- Paraboea vachareea Triboun & Sonsupab
- Paraboea variopila Z.R.Xu & B.L.Burtt
- Paraboea velutina (W.T.Wang & C.Z.Gao) B.L.Burtt
- Paraboea verticillata (Ridl.) B.L.Burtt
- Paraboea vulpina Ridl.
- Paraboea wenshanensis Xin Hong & F.Wen
- Paraboea xiangguiensis W.B.Xu & B.Pan
- Paraboea xylocaulis Triboun
- Paraboea yunfuensis F.Wen & Y.G.Wei
- Paraboea zunyiensis Tan Deng, F.Wen & R.B.Zhang
