= Paraboea halongensis =

Scientific classification
- Kingdom: Plantae
- Clade: Embryophytes
- Clade: Tracheophytes
- Clade: Spermatophytes
- Clade: Angiosperms
- Clade: Eudicots
- Clade: Asterids
- Order: Lamiales
- Family: Gesneriaceae
- Genus: Paraboea
- Species: P. halongensis

Binomial name
- Paraboea halongensis Kiew & T.H.Nguyên

Species of flowering plant

Paraboea halongensis is a plant in the family Gesneriaceae, native to Vietnam. The specific epithet halongensis is for Hạ Long Bay, where the species is found.

== Description ==
Paraboea halongensis grows as a perennial shrub. Its lanceolate to ovate leaves measure up to 4.3 centimetres (2 in) long. The inflorescences bear white flowers.

== Distribution and habitat ==
Paraboea halongensis is endemic to Vietnam, where is it is confined to the islands of Hạ Long Bay, a UNESCO World Heritage Site. Its habitat is in cracks on rocks higher up on the limestone islands.
