= Paraboea babae =

Scientific classification
- Kingdom: Plantae
- Clade: Embryophytes
- Clade: Tracheophytes
- Clade: Spermatophytes
- Clade: Angiosperms
- Clade: Eudicots
- Clade: Asterids
- Order: Lamiales
- Family: Gesneriaceae
- Genus: Paraboea
- Species: P. babae

Binomial name
- Paraboea babae D.J.Middleton
- It is endemic to Myanmar

Species of flowering plant

Paraboea babae is a plant in the family Gesneriaceae, endemic to Myanmar.

== Taxonomy ==
The species was first described in 2023 by David John Middleton, based on a single specimen found by a team of researchers in September 2015 in Shan State. The species epithet refers to Japanese-New Zealand biologist Yumiko Baba, who was the lead collector of the specimen. The holotype is stored at the Singapore Botanic Gardens' herbarium.
