= Hạ Long Bay =

Bay in northern Vietnam

Hạ Long Bay and Cát Bà Islands
UNESCO World Heritage Site
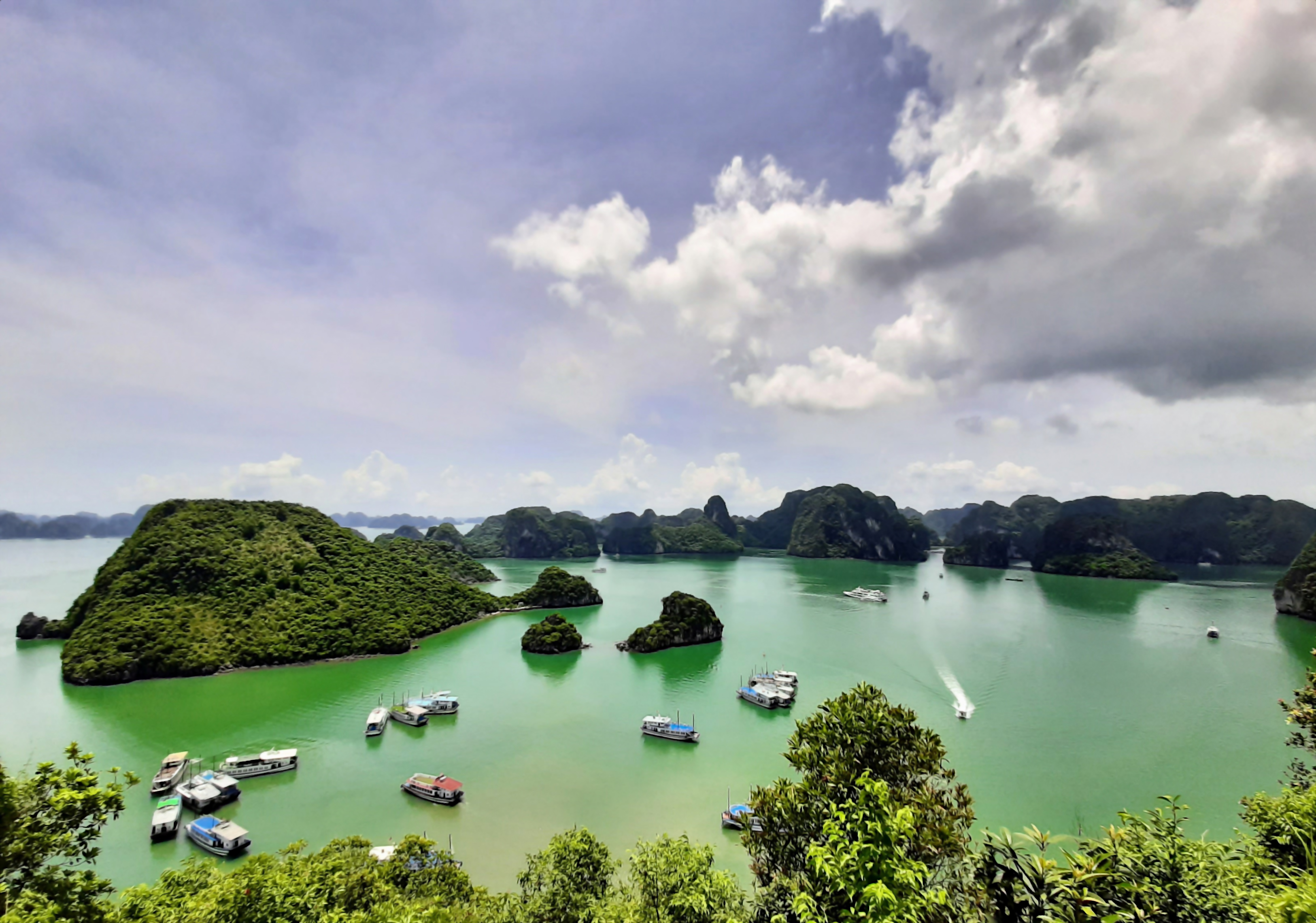

- Location within Vietnam
- Location: Vietnam
- Criteria: Natural: vii, viii, ix, x
- Reference: 672
- Inscription: 1994 (18th Session)
- Extensions: 2000, 2023
- Coordinates: 20°54′N 107°12′E

Hạ Long Bay or Halong Bay (Vietnamese: Vịnh Hạ Long, pronounced [vînˀ hâːˀ lawŋm]) is a bay located in Northeastern Vietnam, administered by the city of Quảng Ninh. The name Hạ Long means "descending dragon". It features thousands of limestone karsts and islets in various shapes and sizes, for which it is listed as a UNESCO World Heritage Site and a popular travel destination. The bay is also part of a larger area that includes Bai Tu Long Bay to the northeast and Cát Bà Island (administered by Haiphong) to the southwest. These zones share similar geological, geographical, geomorphological, climatic, and cultural characteristics.

Hạ Long Bay has an area of around 1,553 km^{2} (600 sq mi), including 1,969 islets, most of which are made of limestone. The core of the bay has an area of 334 km^{2} (129 sq mi) with a high density of 775 islets. The limestone in this bay has gone through 500 million years of formation in different conditions and environments. The evolution of the karst in this bay has taken 20 million years under the impact of the tropical wet climate. The geo-diversity of the environment in the area has created biodiversity, including a tropical evergreen biosystem and a seashore biosystem. Hạ Long Bay is home to 14 endemic floral species and 60 endemic faunal species.

Historical research surveys have shown the presence of prehistoric human beings in this area tens of thousands of years ago. The successive ancient cultures are the Soi Nhụ culture around 18,000–7,000 BC, the Cái Bèo culture 7,000–5,000 BC and the Hạ Long culture 5,000–3,500 years ago. Hạ Long Bay also marked some important events in Vietnamese history, with many artifacts found in Bài Thơ mountain, Đầu Gỗ cave, and Bãi Cháy.

Nguyễn Trãi praised the beauty of Hạ Long Bay 500 years ago in his verse Lộ nhập Vân Đồn, in which he called it "a rock wonder in the sky". In 1962, the Ministry of Culture, Sports and Tourism of North Vietnam listed Hạ Long Bay in the National Relics and Landscapes publication. In 1994, the core zone of the bay was listed as a UNESCO World Heritage Site under Criterion VII, and was listed for a second time under Criterion VIII.

== Etymology ==
The name Hạ Long (chữ Hán: 下龍) means "descending dragon".

Before the 19th century, the name Hạ Long Bay had not been recorded in the old books of the country. It has been called other names such as An Bang, Lục Thủy, and Vân Đồn. In the late 19th century, the name Hạ Long Bay appeared on the Maritime Map of France. The French-language Hai Phong News reported "Dragon appears on Hạ Long Bay".

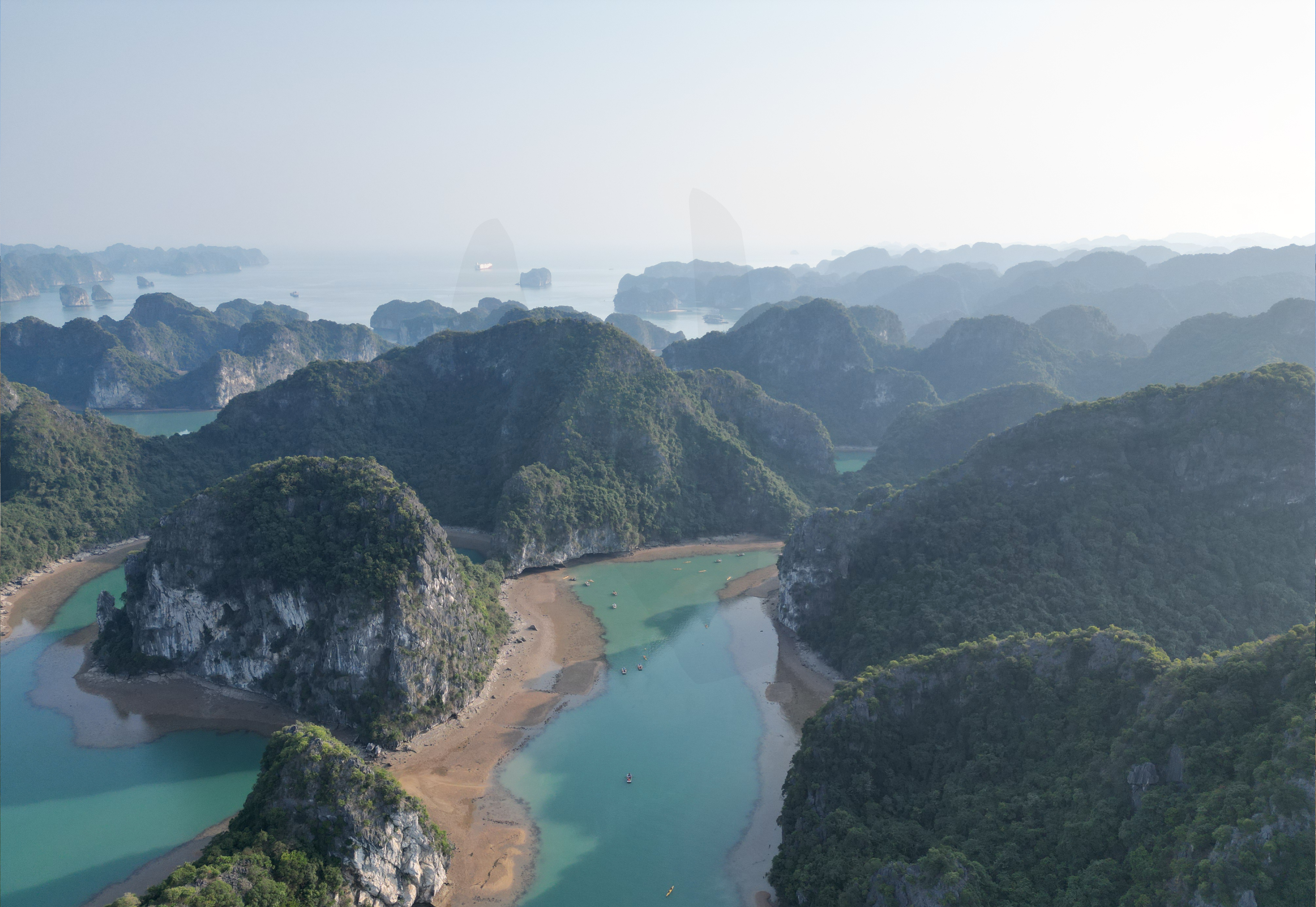
Drone shot of limestone cliffs

According to local legend reinforced by 1800s Nguyễn dynasty nationalism, when Vietnam had just started to develop into a country, they had to fight against invaders. To assist the Vietnamese in defending their country, the gods sent a family of dragons as protectors. This family of dragons began spitting out jewels and jade. These jewels turned into the islands and islets dotting the bay, linking together to form a great wall against the invaders. Under magics, numerous rock mountains abruptly appeared on the sea, ahead of invaders' ships; the forward ships struck the rocks and each other. After winning the battle, the dragons were interested in peaceful sightseeing of the Earth, and then decided to live in this bay. The place where the mother dragon descended was named Hạ Long, the place where the dragon's children attended upon their mother was called Bái Tử Long island (Bái: attend upon, Tử: children, Long: dragon), and the place where the dragon's children wriggled their tails violently was called Bạch Long Vĩ island (Bạch: white-color of the foam made when Dragon's children wriggled, Long: dragon, Vĩ: tail), present-day Tra Co peninsula, Móng Cái.

== Overview ==
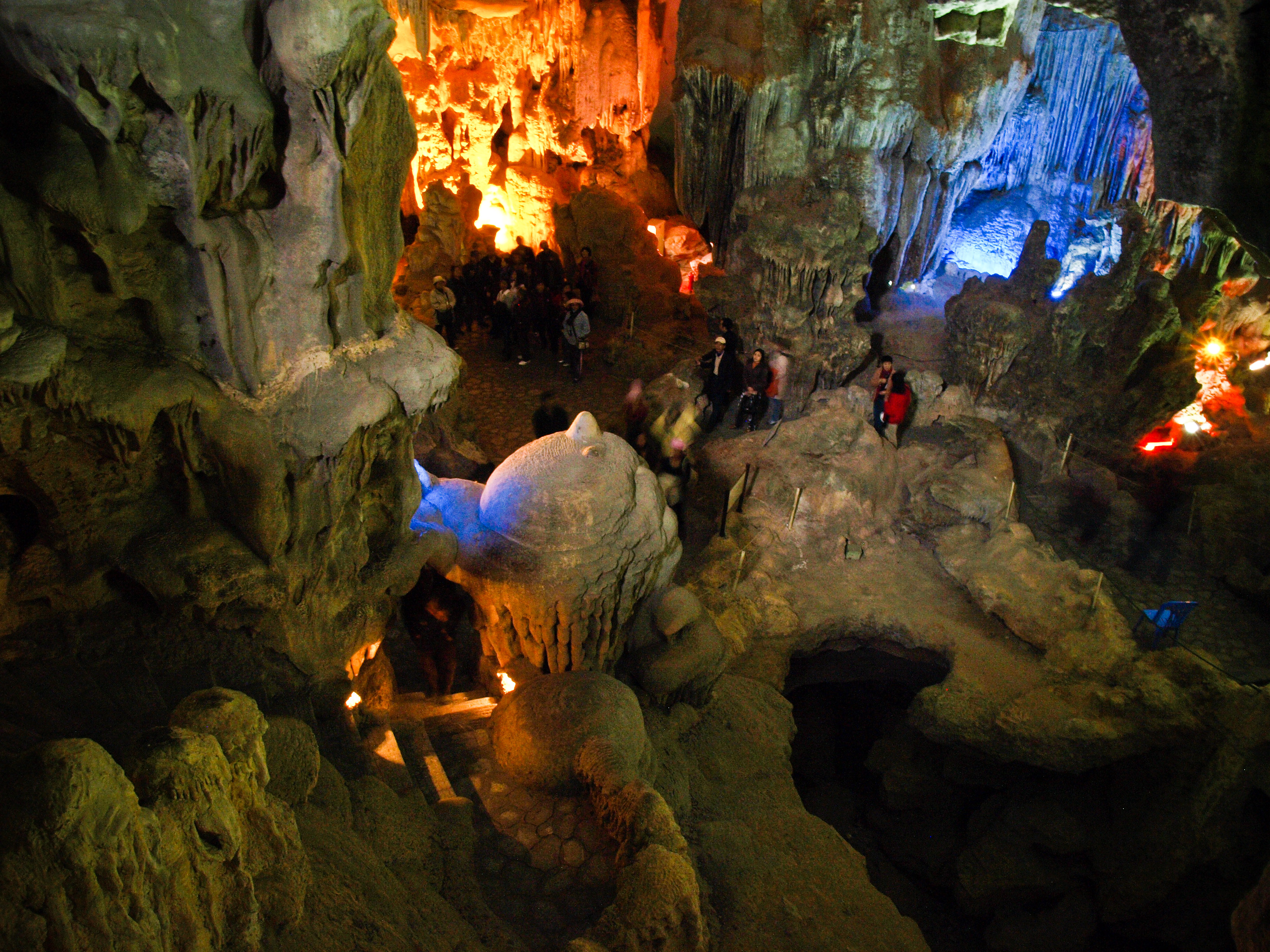
Thiên Cung grotto

The bay consists of a dense cluster of some 1,600 limestone monolithic islands each topped with thick jungle vegetation, rising from the ocean. Several of the islands are hollow, with large caves. Hang Dau Go (Wooden Stakes cave) is the largest grotto in the Hạ Long area. French tourists visited in the late 19th century, and named the cave Grotte des Merveilles. Its three large chambers contain large numerous stalactites and stalagmites (as well as 19th-century French graffiti). There are two bigger islands, Tuần Châu and Cát Bà, that have permanent inhabitants, as well as tourist facilities including hotels and beaches. There are a number of beautiful beaches on the smaller islands.

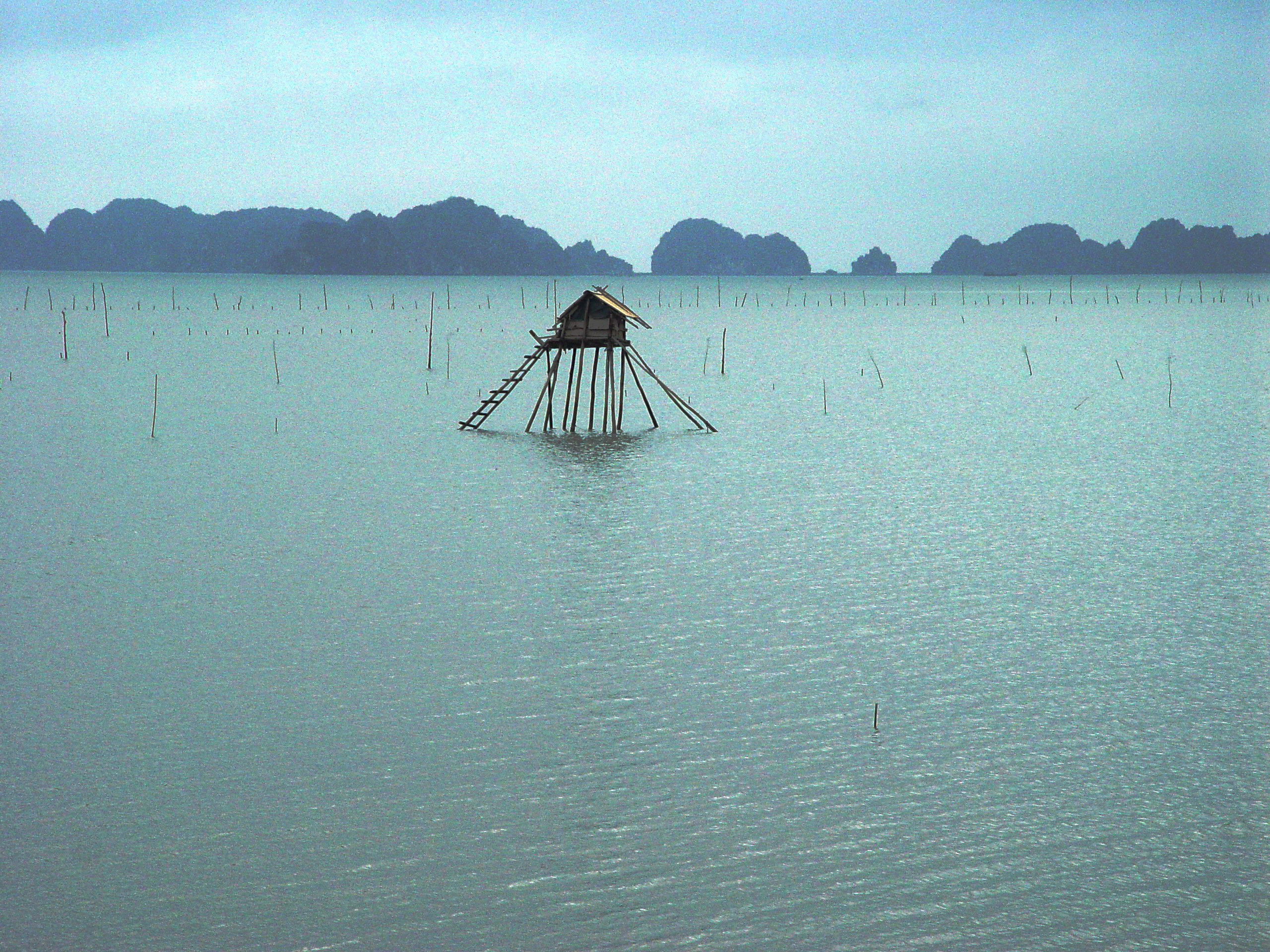
Fisherman's house

A community of around 1,600 people live on Hạ Long Bay in four fishing villages: Cua Van, Ba Hang, Cong Tau and Vong Vieng in Hung Thang ward, Hạ Long city. They live on floating houses and are sustained through fishing and marine aquaculture (cultivating marine biota), plying the shallow waters for 200 species of fish and 450 different kinds of mollusks. Many of the islands have acquired their names as a result of their unusual shapes. Such names include Voi Islet (elephant), Ga Choi Islet (fighting cock), Khi Islet (monkey), and Mai Nha Islet (roof). 989 of the islands have been given names. Birds and land animals including bantams, antelopes, monkeys, and lizards also live on some of the islands.

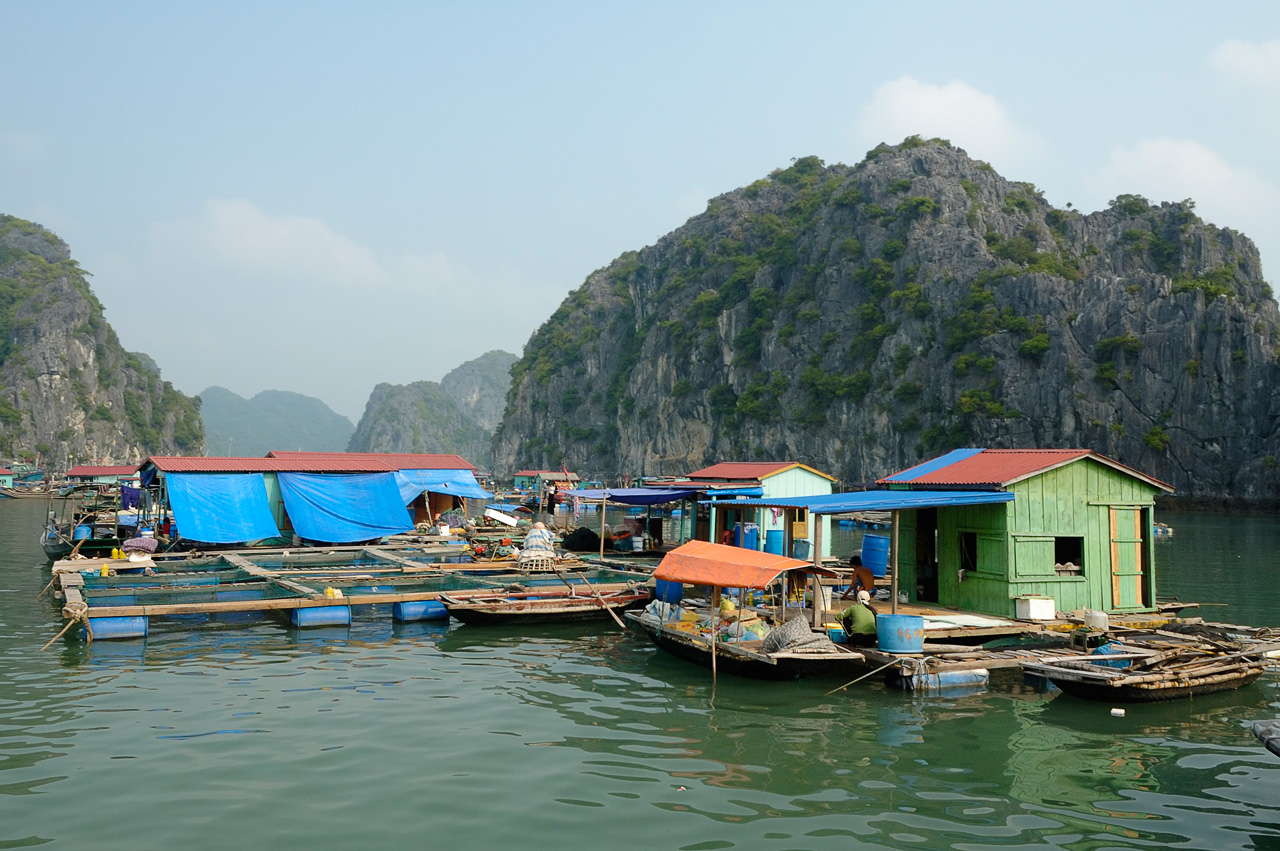
Floating fishing village

Almost all these islands are as individual towers in a classic fenglin landscape with heights ranging from 50–100 metres (160–330 ft), and height/width ratios of up to about six.

Another specific feature of Hạ Long Bay is the abundance of lakes inside the limestone islands. For example, Dau Be island has six enclosed lakes. All these island lakes occupy drowned dolines within fengcong karst.

=== Location ===
Hạ Long Bay is located in northeastern Vietnam, from E106°55' to E107°37' and from N20°43' to N21°09'. The bay stretches from Quang Yen town, past Hạ Long city, Cẩm Phả city to Vân Đồn District, is bordered on the south and southeast by Lan Ha Bay, on the north by Hạ Long city, and on the west by Bai Tu Long Bay. The bay has a 120-kilometre-long (75 mi) coastline and is approximately 1,553 km^{2} (600 sq mi) in size with about 2,000 islets. The area designated by UNESCO as the World Natural Heritage Site incorporates 434 km^{2} (168 sq mi) with 775 islets, of which the core zone is delimited by 69 points: Dau Go island on the west, Ba Ham lake on the south and Cong Tay island on the east. The protected area is from the Cái Dăm petrol store to Quang Hanh ward, Cẩm Phả city and the surrounding zone.

=== Climate ===
The climate of the bay is tropical, wet, sea islands, with two seasons: hot and moist summer, dry and cold winter. The average temperature is from 15–25 °C (59–77 °F), and annual rainfall is between 2 and 2.2 metres (6.6 and 7.2 ft). Hạ Long Bay has the typical diurnal tide system (tide amplitude ranges from 3.5–4 metres or 11–13 feet). The salinity is from 31 to 34.5MT in the dry season and lower in the rainy season.

=== Population ===
Of the 1,969 islands in Hạ Long, only approximately 40 are inhabited. These islands range from tens to thousands of hectares in size, mainly in the East and Southeast of Hạ Long Bay. In recent decades, thousands of villagers have been starting to settle down on the pristine islands and build new communities such as Sa Tô Island (Hạ Long City) and Thắng Lợi Island (Vân Đồn district).

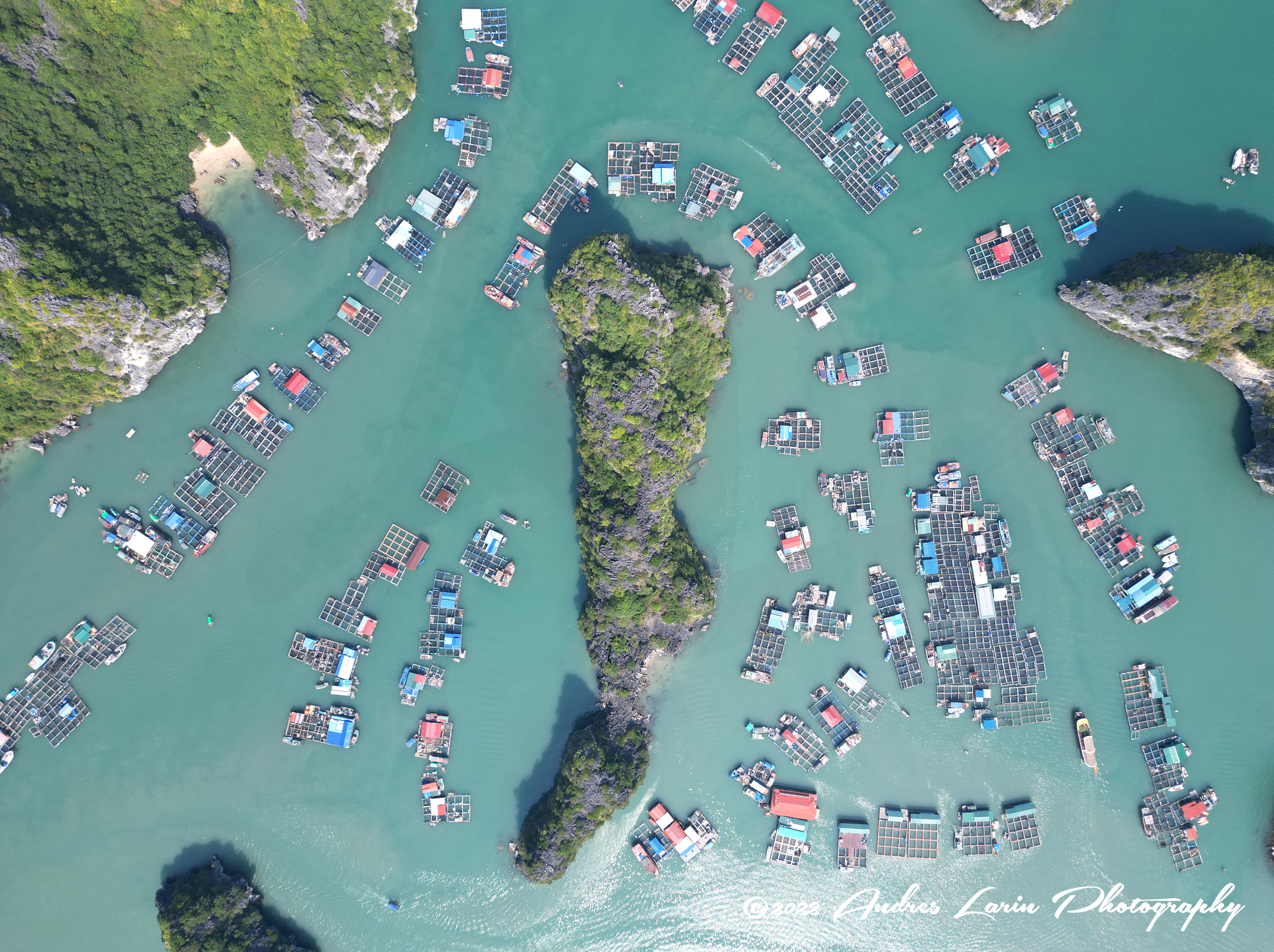
Cai Beo floating fishing village

The population of Hạ Long Bay is about 1,540, mainly in Cửa Vạn, Ba Hang and Cặp Dè fishing villages (Hùng Thắng Ward, Hạ Long City). Residents of the bay mostly live on boats and rafts buoyed by tires and plastic jugs to facilitate the fishing, cultivating and breeding of aquatic and marine species. Fish require feeding every other day for up to three years, when they are eventually sold to local seafood restaurants for up to 300,000 Vietnamese dong per kilogram. Today, the lives of Hạ Long Bay inhabitants have much improved due to new travel businesses. Residents of the floating villages around Hạ Long Bay now offer bedrooms for rent, boat tours, and fresh seafood meals to tourists. While this is an isolating, back-breaking lifestyle, floating village residents are considered wealthy compared to residents of other Hạ Long Bay islands.

At present, the Quảng Ninh provincial government has a policy to relocate the households living in the bay to resettle, in order to stabilize their life and to protect the landscape of the heritage zone. More than 300 households living in fishing villages in Hạ Long Bay have been relocated ashore in Khe Cá Resettlement Area, now known as Zone 8 (Hà Phong Ward, Hạ Long City) since May 2014. This project will continue to be implemented. The province will only retain a number of fishing villages for sightseeing tours.

== History ==
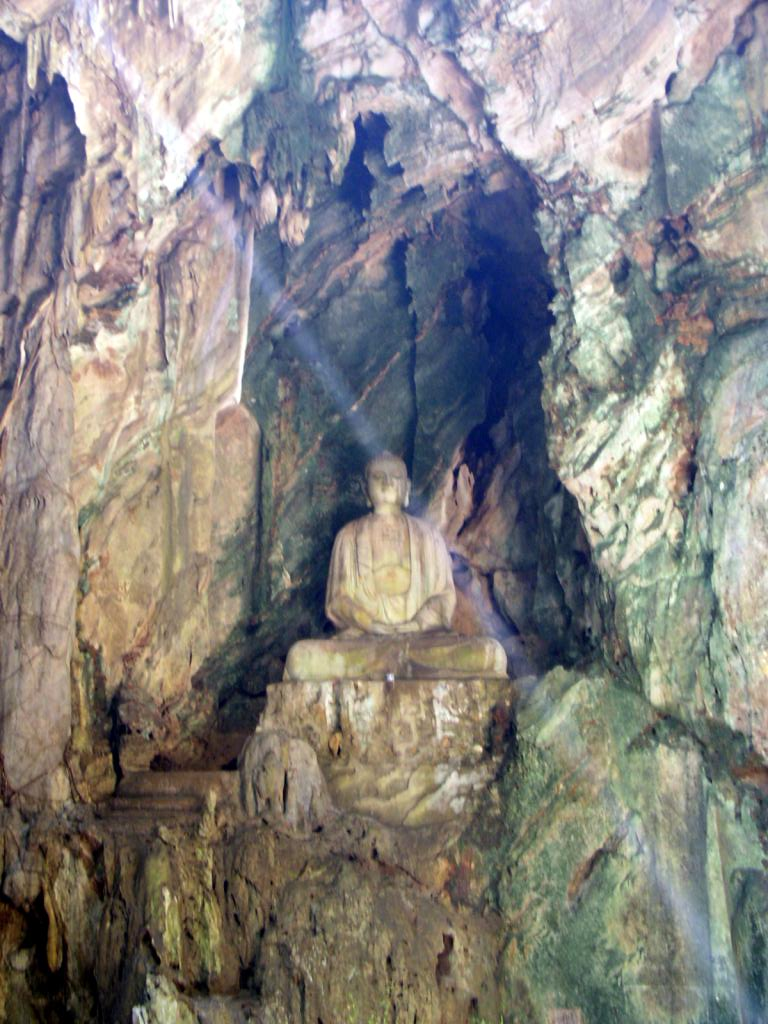
Statue of Buddha inside a cave, erected in the 16–17th century

=== Soi Nhụ culture (16,000–5000 BC) ===
Located within Hạ Long and Bái Tử Long are archaeological sites such as Mê Cung and Thiên Long. There are remains from mounds of mountain shellfish (Cyclophorus), spring shellfish (Melania, also called Thiana), some freshwater water mollusc and some rudimentary labour tools. The main way of life of Soi Nhụ's inhabitants included catching fish and shellfish, collecting fruits and digging for bulbs and roots. Their living environment was a coastal area unlike other Vietnamese cultures, for example, those found in Hòa Bình and Bắc Sơn.

=== Cái Bèo culture (5000–3000 BC) ===
Located in Hạ Long and Cát Bà island its inhabitants developed to the level of sea exploitation. Cái Bèo culture is a link between Soi Nhụ culture and Hạ Long culture.

=== Classical period ===
Hạ Long Bay was the setting for historical naval battles against Vietnam's coastal neighbors. On three occasions, in the labyrinth of channels in Bạch Đằng River near the islands, the Vietnamese army stopped the Chinese invaders from landing. In 1288, General Trần Hưng Đạo stopped Mongol ships from sailing up the nearby Bạch Đằng River by placing steel-tipped wooden stakes at high tide, sinking the Mongol Kublai Khan's fleet.

=== Modern period ===
Hạ Long Bay was the site of the first ever raising of the new national flag of the Provisional Central Government of Vietnam on 5 June 1948 during the signing of the Halong Bay Agreements (Accords de la baie d’Along) by High Commissioner Emile Bollaert and President Nguyễn Văn Xuân.

During the Vietnam War, many of the channels between the islands were heavily mined by the United States Navy, some of which continue to pose threats to shipping routes in the present day.

== Geology and geomorphology ==
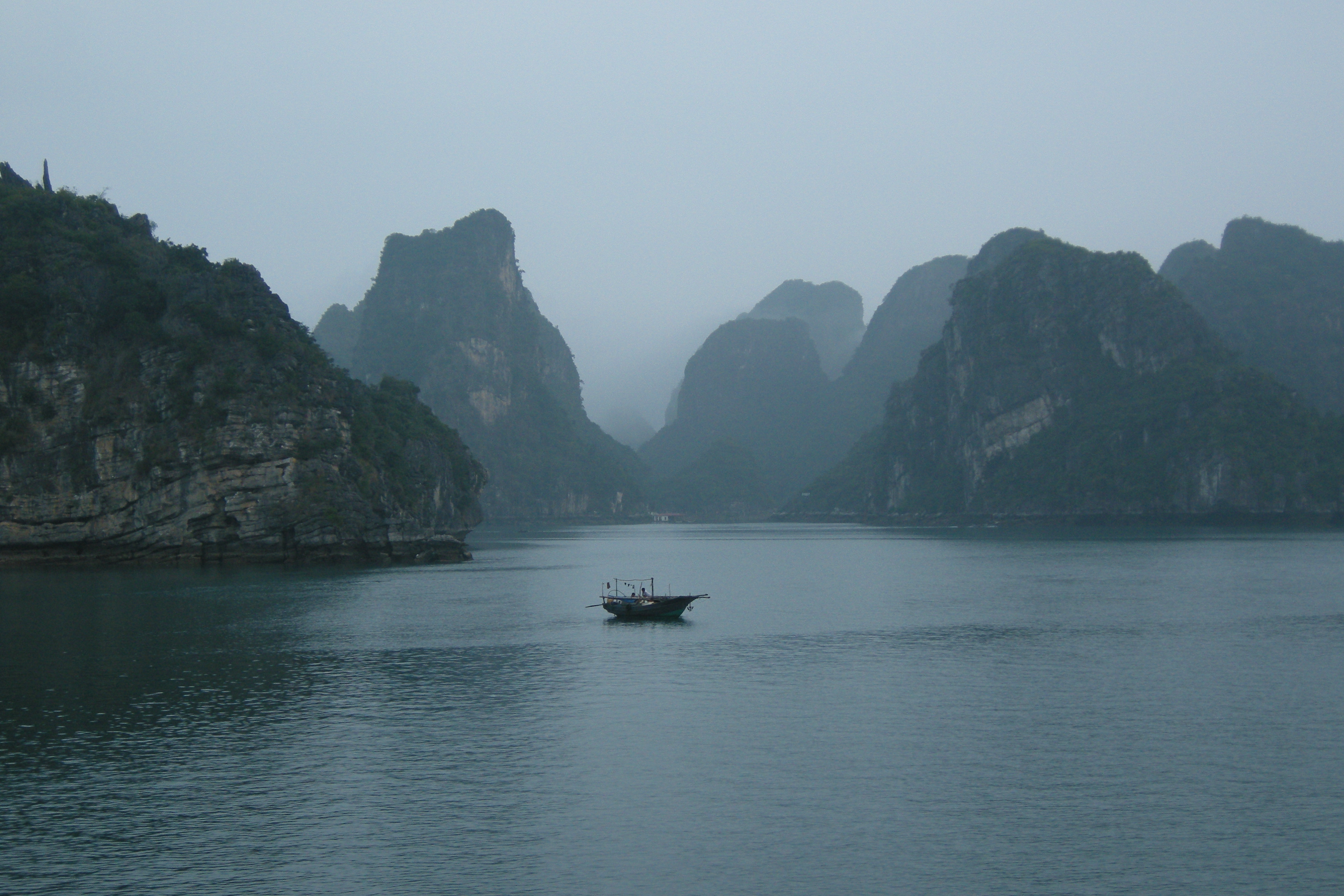
Karst formations

In 2000, UNESCO's World Heritage Committee inscribed Hạ Long Bay in the World Heritage List according to its outstanding examples representing major stages of the Earth's history and its original limestone karstic geomorphologic features. Hạ Long Bay and its adjacent areas consist of a part of the Sino-Vietnamese composite terrane having its development history from pre-Cambrian up to present day. During Phanerozoic, terrigenous, volcanogenic and cherty-carbonate sediments containing in abundance graptolites, bivalves, brachiopods, fishes, foraminiferans, corals, radiolarias, and flora, separated from one from another by 10 stratigraphic gaps, but the boundary between Devonian and Carboniferous has been considered as continuous. The limestone karstic geomorphology of the bay has developed since the Miocene, especially the cone-shaped hills (fengcong), or isolated high limestone karst towers (fenglin) with many remnants of old phreatic caves, old karstic foot caves, and marine notch caves forming magnificent limestone karst landforms unique to the world. The Quaternary geology was developed through 5 cycles with the intercalation of marine and continental environments. The present Hạ Long Bay, in fact, appeared after the Middle Holocene maximum transgression, leaving ultimate zone of lateral undercutting in the limestone cliffs bearing many shells of oysters, having the 14C age as 2280 to >40,000 y. BP. Geological resources are abundant, including anthracite, petroleum, lignite, phosphate, oil shale, limestone and cement additives, kaolin, silica sand, dolomite, quartzite of exogenous origin, antimony, and mercury of hydrothermal origin. Additionally, there is surface water, groundwater and thermal mineral water on the shore of the Hạ Long – Bái Tử Long Bays, as well as other environmental resources.

In terms of marine geology, this area is recorded as an especially coastal sedimentary environment. In the alkaline seawater environment, the chemical denudation process of calcium carbonate proceeds rapidly, creating wide, strangely shaped marine notches.

The bottom surface sediments are various from clay mud to sand, however, silty mud and clay mud dominate in distribution. Especially, the carbonate materials originated from organisms make up 60 to 65% sedimentary content. The surface sediments of coral reefs are mainly sand and pebbles, of which the carbonate materials account for more than 90%. The intertidal zone sediments are various, from clay mud to sand and gravel, depending on distinguished sedimentary environments such as mangrove marshes, tidal flats, beaches etc. At the small beaches, the sand sediments may be dominated quartz or carbonate materials.

The sediment layers of the intertidal zone, the upper sea bed with a plain surface conserving ancient rivers, the systems of caves and their sediments, traces of ancient marine action forming distinctive notches, beaches and marine terraces, and mangrove swamps are important evidence of geological events and processes taking place during the Quaternary Period.

=== Karst geomorphology value ===
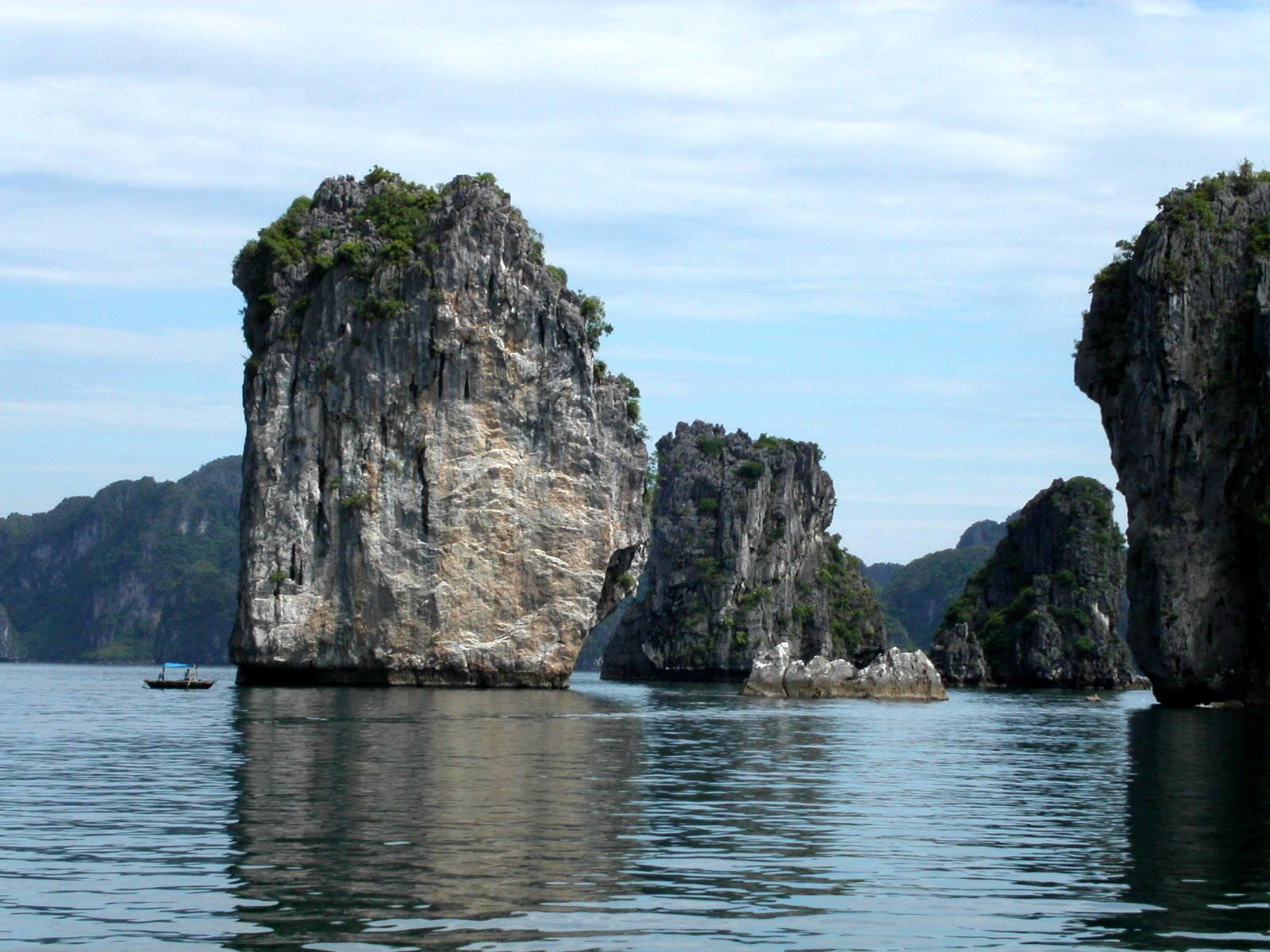
Limestone islets

Due to a simultaneous combination of ideal factors such as thick, pale, grey, and strong limestone layers, which are formed by fine-grained materials; hot and moist climate and slow tectonic process as a whole; Hạ Long Bay has had a complete karst evolution for 20 million years. There are many types of karst topography in the bay, such as karst field.

Hạ Long Bay is a mature karst landscape developed during a warm, wet, tropical climate. The sequence of stages in the evolution of a karst landscape over a period of 20 million years requires a combination of several distinct elements including a massive thickness of limestone, a hot wet climate and slow overall tectonic up lift. The process of karst formation is divided into five stages, the second of which is the formation of the distinctive do line karst. This is followed by the development of fengcong karst, which can be seen in the groups of hills on Bo Hon and Dau Be Inland. These cones with sloping sides average 100m in height with the tallest exceeding 200m. Fenglin karst is characterized by steep separate towers. The hundreds of rocky islands that form the beautiful and famous landscape of the Bay are the individual towers of a classic Fenglin landscape where the intervening plains have been submerged by the sea. Most towers reach a height of between 50 and 100m with a height to width ratio of about 6. The karst dolines were flooded by the sea, becoming the abundance of lakes that lie within the limestone islands. For example, Dau Be island at the mouth of the Bay has six enclosed lakes including those of the Ba Ham lakes lying within its fengcong karst. The Bay contains examples of the landscape elements of fengcong, fenglin and karst plain. These are not separate evolutionary stages but the result of natural non-uniform processes in the denudation of a large mass of limestone. Marine erosion created the notches which in some places have been enlarged into caves. The marine notch is a feature of limestone coastline but, in Hạ Long Bay, it has created the mature landscape.

Within Hạ Long Bay, the main accessible caves are the older passages that survive from the time when the karst was evolving through its various stages of fengcong and fenglin. Three main types of caves can be recognized in the limestone islands (Waltham, T. 1998):

- Remnants of old phreatic caves
- Old karstic foot caves
- Marine notch caves

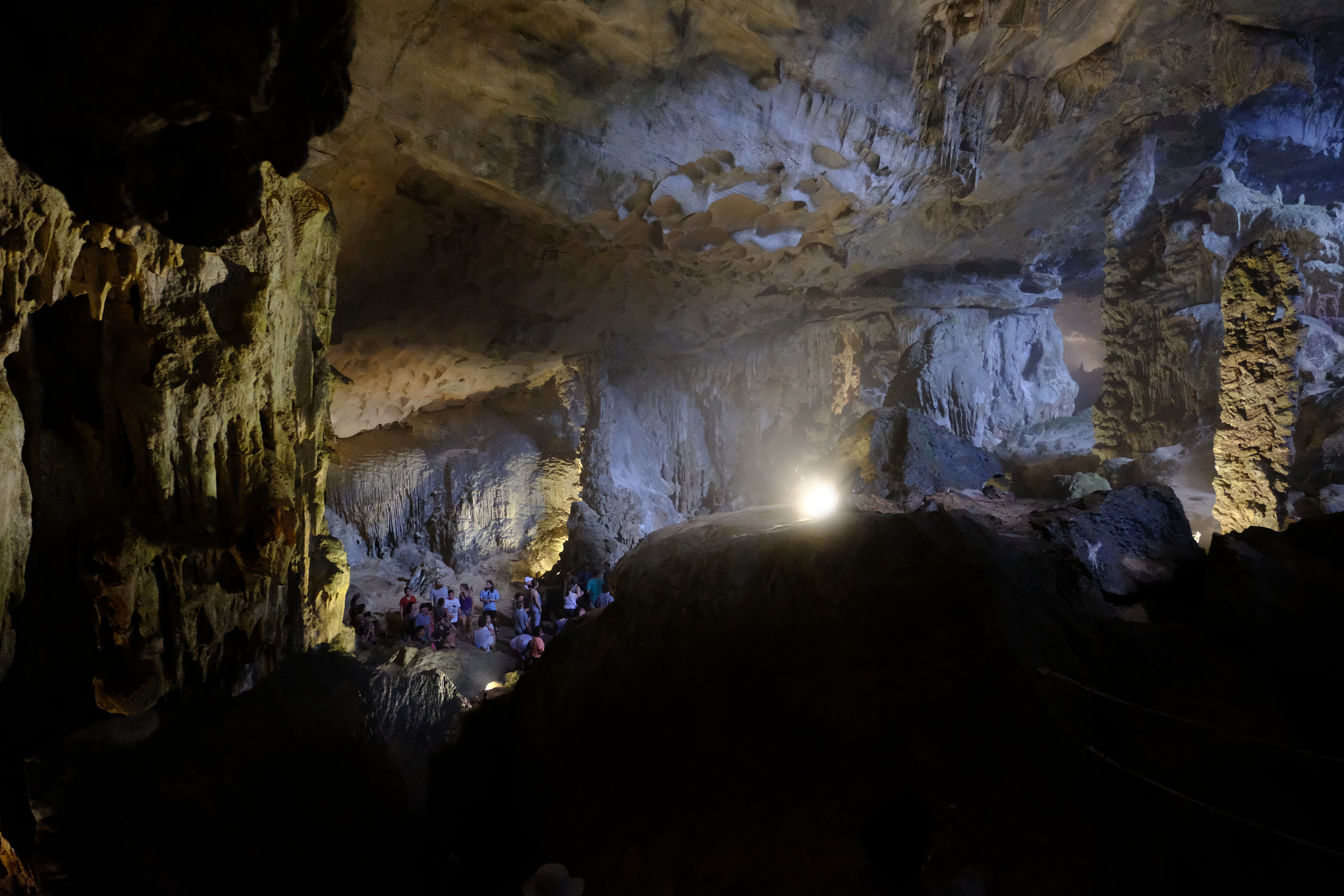
Sửng Sốt cave

The first group consists of old phreatic caves which include Sung Sot, Tam Cung, Lau Dai, Thien Cung, Dau Go, Hoang Long, Thien Long. Nowadays, these caves lie at various heights. Sung Sot cave is on Bo Hon Island. From its truncated entrance chambers on a ledge high on the cliff, a passage of more than 10m high and wide descends to the south. Tam Cung is a large phreatic fissure cave that developed in the bedding planes of the limestone dividing the fissure cave into three chambers. Lau Dai is a cave with a complex of passages extending over 300 meters on the south side of Con Ngua Island. Thien Cung and Dau Go are remnants of the same old cave system. They both survive in the northern part of Dau Go Island at between 20 and 50m above sea level. Thien Cung has one large chamber more than 100m long, blocked at its ends and almost subdivided into smaller chambers by a massive wall of stalactites and stalagmites. Dau Go is a single large tunnel descending along a major set of fractures to a massive choke.

The second group of caves is the old karstic foot caves which include Trinh Lu, Bo Nau, Tien Ong and Trong caves. Foot caves are a ubiquitous feature of karst landscapes which have reached a stage of widespread lateral undercutting at base level. They may extend back into maze caves of stream caves draining from larger cave systems within the limestone. They are distinguished by the main elements of their passages being close to the horizontal and are commonly related to denuded or accumulated terraces at the old base levels. Trinh Nu, which is one of the larger foot caves in Hạ Long Bay with its ceiling at about 12m above sea level and about 80m in length, was developed in multiple stages. Bo Nau, a horizontal cave containing old stalactite deposits, cuts across the 25o dip of the bedding plane.

The third group is the marine notch caves which're a special feature of the karst of Hạ Long Bay. The dissolution process of sea water acting on the limestone and erosion by wave action creates notches at the base of the cliffs. In advantageous conditions, dissolution of the limestone allows the cliff notches to be steadily deepened and extended into caves. Many of these at sea level extend right through the limestone hills into drowned dolinas which are now tidal lakes.

A distinguishing feature of marine notch caves is an absolutely smooth and horizontal ceiling cut through the limestone. Some marine notch caves had not been not formed at present sea level, but old sea levels related to sea level changes in Holocene transgression, event to Pleistocene sea levels. Some of them preserved the development of old karstic foot caves in mainland environments or preserved the remnants of older phreatic caves. One of the most unusual features of Hạ Long Bay is the Bo Ham lake group of hidden lakes and their connecting tunnel – notch caves in Dau Be Island. From the island's perimeter cliff a cave, 10m wide at water level and curving so that it is almost completely dark, extends about 150m to Lake 1. Luon Cave is on Bo Hon Island and extends 50m meters to an enclosed tidal lake. It has a massive stalactite hanging 2m down and truncated at the modern tidal level. It has passed through many stages in its formation.

The karst landscape of Hạ Long Bay is of international significance and of fundamental importance to the science of geomorphology. The fenglin tower karst, which is the type present in much of Hạ Long Bay, is the most extreme form of limestone landscape development. If these karst landscapes are broadly compared in terms of their height, steepness and number of their limestone towers, Hạ Long Bay is probably second in the entire world only to Yangshuo, in China. However, Hạ Long Bay has also been invaded by the sea so that the geomorphology of its limestone islands are, at least in part, the consequence of marine erosion. The marine invasion distinguishes Hạ Long Bay and makes it unique in the world. There are other areas of submerged karst towers which were invaded by the sea, but none is as extensive as Hạ Long Bay.

=== Timeline of geologic evolution ===
Some of the most remarkable geological events in Hạ Long Bay's history have occurred in the last 1,000 years, include the advance of the sea, the raising of the bay area, strong erosion that has formed coral, and, pure blue and heavily salted water. This process of erosion by seawater has deeply engraved the stone, contributing to its natural beauty. Present-day Hạ Long Bay is the result of this long process of geological evolution that has been influenced by so many factors.

Due to all these factors, tourists visiting Hạ Long Bay are not only treated to one of the natural wonders of the world, but also to a geological museum that has been naturally preserved in the open air for the last 300 million years.

Years ago	Geologic period	Events
570,000,000–500,000,000	Beginning of the Cambrian Period	The area, which now forms Hạ Long Bay, was mostly mainland, subject to a process of rain-induced erosion.
	End of the Cambrian Period	The area was flooded, bringing Hạ Long Bay into existence.
500,000,000–400,000,000	Ordovician and Silurian periods	The area of north-east Vietnam was akin to deep sea, subjected to the constant activity of tectonic plates.
	End of the Silurian Period	It underwent a phase of inverse-motion that created mountains deep under the water.
420,000,000–340,000,000	End of the Silurian Period and throughout the whole Devonian Period	The area was subjected to powerful forces of erosion from the hot and dry climate. At this point, Hạ Long was part of a wide mainland that comprised most of today's South China Sea and the Chinese continental shelf.
	End of the Devonian Period	Due to tectonic activity, the Hạ Long area and the entire north-east region were raised from the depths.
340,000,000–240,000,000	Later Carboniferous and Permian periods	The formation of the limestone layer more than 1,000 m thick. A shallow and warm sea reformed, which existed for approximately 100 million years. It created two kinds of limestone: the Cát Bà layer of the early Carboniferous period (450 m thick); and the Quang Hanh layer of the middle Carboniferous and the early Permian period (750 m thick). These two layers constitute the majority of the islands of the Bay.
67,000,000	End of the Cretaceous Period	Hạ Long Bay existed in the environment of a high mountainous mainland due to the influence of strong mountain-forming phases.
	Middle of the Paleogene Period	These motions remain continuous and stable, while strong processes of erosion began, and after millions of years, a form of semi-highland topography took shape. The continuation of this erosion has progressively cut the highlands into blocks with altitudes similar to today's mountains.
26,000,000–10,000,000	Neogene Period	The development of the Hạ Long depression.
2,000,000–11,000	Pleistocene epoch of the Quaternary period	The process of erosion began dissolving the limestone-rich region of Hạ Long, after that, forming the limestone plain was most active.
68,000–11,000	Middle and late Pleistocene Epoch	Period when the caves and grottoes of the area formed.
	Early Holocene Epoch	The islands of today's Hạ Long Bay are basically remnants of these mountains, flooded. Rainwater flowed into crevices in the limestone that had formed from tectonic activity. This steady erosion constantly widened the cracks, eventually creating today's formations.
11,000–7,000	Holocene Epoch	This period is notable for the advance of the sea.
7,000–4,000		The movement of the sea reached its peak and began forming today's Hạ Long Bay.
4,000–3,000		With the sea in a steady process of recession, Hạ Long culture began to develop.
	Beginning of the late Holocene Epoch	The level of the water once again increased, forming a marshy floor of canals and streams, and creating the water marks that can be seen on the stone cliffs of today.

== Ecology ==
Two ecosystems coexist in Ha Long Bay: a tropical, moist, evergreen rainforest ecosystem and a marine and coastal ecosystem. Livistona halongensis, Impatiens halongensis, Chirita halongensis, Chirita hiepii, Chirita modesta, Paraboea halongensis, and Alpinia calcicola are among the seven endemic species found in the bay. There is also some bioluminescent plankton.

The many islands that dot the bay are home to a great many other species, including (but likely not limited to): 477 magnoliales, 12 pteris, 20 salt marsh flora; and 4 amphibia, 10 reptilia, 40 aves, and 4 mammalia.

Common aquatic species found in the bay include: cuttlefish (mực); oyster (hào); cyclinae (ngán); prawns (penaeidea (tôm he), panulirus (tôm hùm), parapenaeopsis (tôm sắt), etc.); sipunculoideas (sá sùng); nerita (ốc đĩa); charonia tritonis (ốc tù và); and cà sáy. A new species of sponge, Cladocroce pansinii, was discovered in underwater caves attached to the bay in 2023.

=== Environmental damage ===
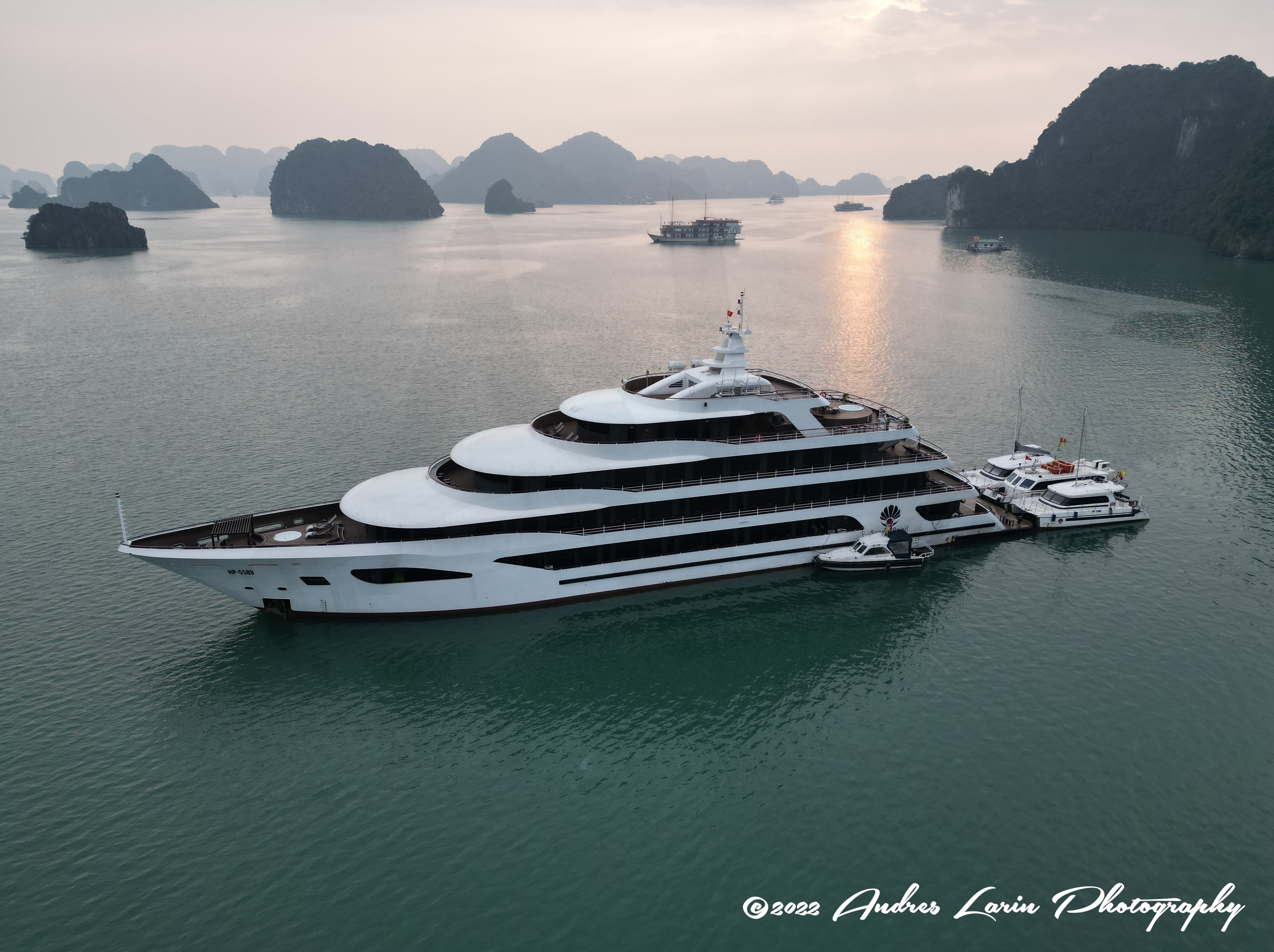
A yacht docking in the bay

With an increasing tourist trade, mangroves and seagrass beds have been cleared and jetties and wharves have been built for tourist boats.

Game fishing, often near coral reefs, is threatening many endangered species of fish.

Local government and businesses are aware of the problems and many measures have been taken to minimise the impact of tourism on the bay environment for sustainable economic growth like introducing eco-friendly tours and tight waste control on resorts.

== Awards and designations ==
In 1962, the Vietnam Ministry of Culture, Sport and Tourism designated Hạ Long Bay a 'Renowned National Landscape Monument'.

Hạ Long Bay was first listed as a UNESCO World Heritage Site in 1994, in recognition of its outstanding, universal aesthetic value. In 2000, the World Heritage Committee additionally recognised Hạ Long Bay for its outstanding geological and geomorphological value, and its World Heritage Listing was updated.

In October 2011, the World Monuments Fund included the bay on the 2012 World Monuments Watch, citing pressure from tourism and associated developments as threats to the site that must be addressed.

In 2012, the New 7 Wonders Foundation officially named Hạ Long Bay as one of the New 7 Wonders of Nature.

Hạ Long Bay is also a part of the Club of the Most Beautiful Bays of the World.

== Popular culture ==
=== Literature ===
In writings about Hạ Long Bay, the following Vietnamese writers wrote:

- Nguyễn Trãi: "This wonder is ground raising up into the middle of the high sky".
- Xuân Diệu: "Here is the unfinished works of the Beings...Here is the stones which the Giant played and threw away".
- Nguyên Ngọc: "...to form this first- rate wonder, nature only uses: Stone and Water...There are just only two materials themselves chosen from as much as materials, in order to write, to draw, to sculpture, to create everything...It is quite possible that here is the image of the future world".
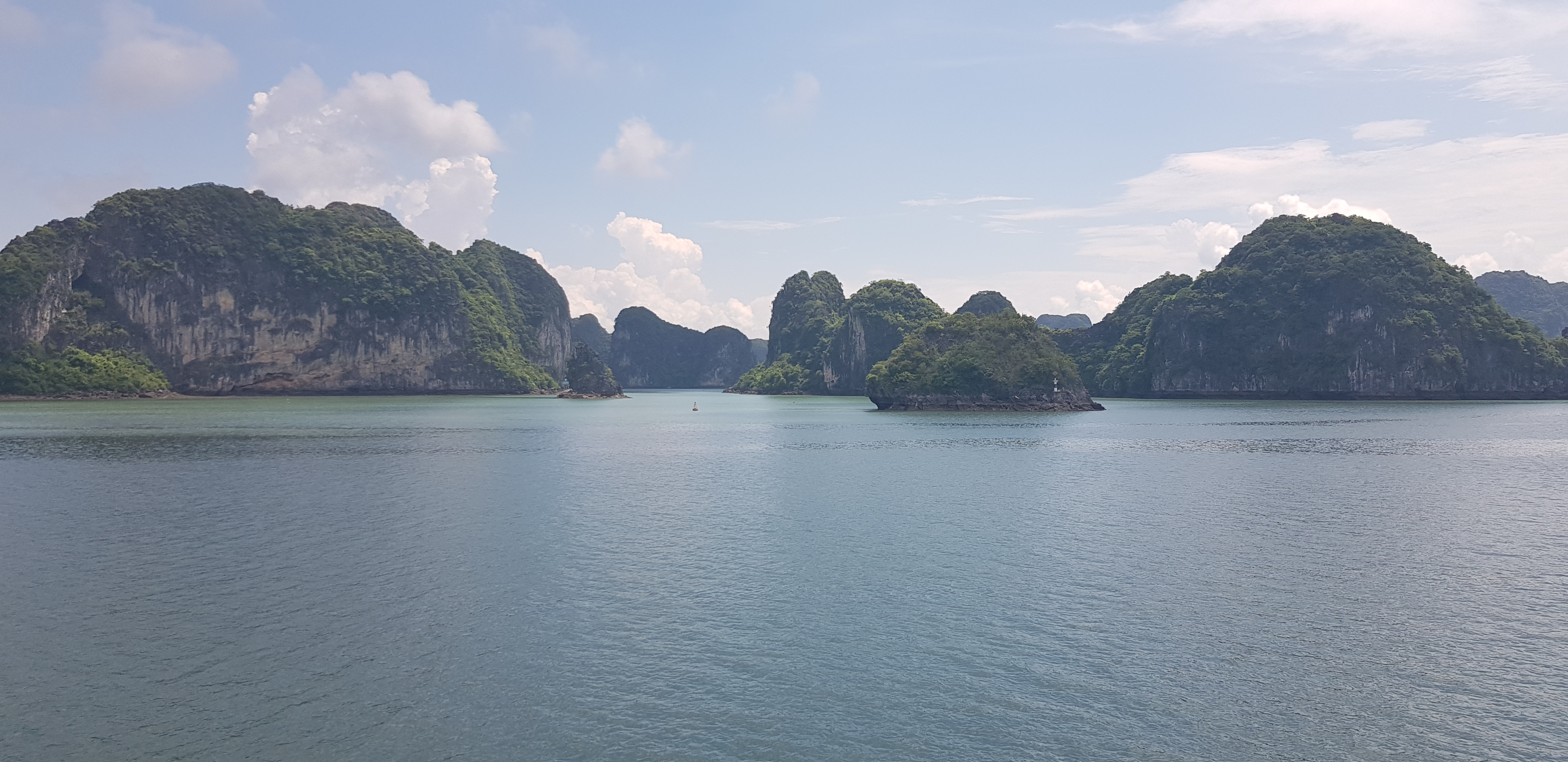
- View of the bay
  Ho Chi Minh: "It is the wonder that one cannot impart to others".
- Phạm Văn Đồng: "Is it one scenery or many sceneries? Is it the scenery in the world or somewhere?".
- Nguyễn Tuân: "Only mountains accept to be old, but Hạ Long sea and wave are young forever".
- Huy Cận: "Night breathes, stars wave Hạ Long's water".
- Chế Lan Viên:

"Hạ Long, Bái Tử Long - Dragons were hidden, only stones still remain
On the moonlight nights, stones meditate as men do..."
Lord Trịnh Cương overflowed with emotion: "Mountains are glistened by water shadow, water spills all over the sky".

=== Ancient tales ===
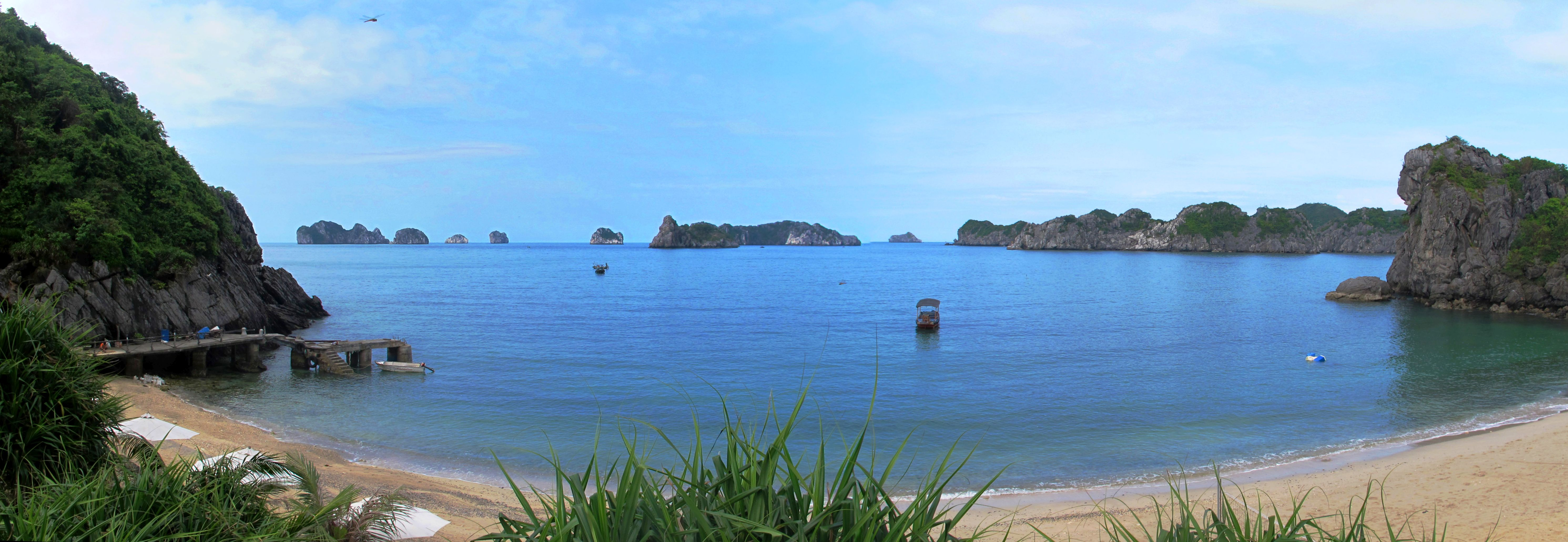
Panorama of the bay, taken on Monkey Island, 2013

The inhabitants of the bay and its adjacent city have transmitted numerous ancient tales explaining names given to various isles and caves in the bay.

- Đầu Gỗ cave ("the end of wooden bars" cave): these wooden bars in this cave are the remnants of sharp wooden columns built under the water level by the order of Trần Hưng Đạo commander in order to sink Mongolian invaders' ships in the 13th century.
- Kim Quy cave ("Golden Turtle" cave): it is told that the Golden Turtle swam toward the Eastern Sea (international name: South China Sea) after returning the holy sword which had assisted King Lê Thái Tổ in the combat against Ming invaders from China. Next, with the approval of the Sea King, Golden Turtle continued to fight against monsters in this marine area. The turtle became exhausted and died in a cave. Consequently, the cave was named after the Golden Turtle.
- Con Cóc islet (Frog islet): a frog-like isle. According to ancient tales, in a year of severe drought, a frog directed all animals to the Heaven and protested against the God. They demonstrated in favour of making rain. As a result, the God must accept the frog as his uncle. Since then, whenever frogs grind their teeth, the God has to pour water down the ground.
- Hang Trống and Hang Trinh Nữ (Male cave and Virgin cave): the tale's about a beautiful woman had fallen in love with a fisherman whom must sail to the sea not so long after their engagement, the landlord saw this beautiful girl and captured her, but with her resistance, the landlord exiled the girl to remote island. After being left to starve, the girl died and turned into a statue people called Hang Trinh Nữ (Virgin Cave). Her betrothed ran to the girl's island and when he found out what had happened, he turned into an islet situated nearby called Hang Trống (Male cave).
- Thiên Cung cave (literally: Paradise cave): this cave is one of the places associated with the ancient dragon king. It told that Thiên Cung cave was the place where the Dragon King's seven-day marriage took place. To congratulate the couple, many dragons and elephants visited to dance and fly.
- Sửng Sốt Cave (Surprise Cave): Local folklore often associates the vast chambers and elaborate stalactite formations of this cave with a mythical palace of the Dragon King or a gathering place of celestial beings. Its name reflects the astonishment visitors experience upon entering the cave’s expansive interior.
- Luồn Cave (Tunnel Cave): According to local tales, this low, water-level cave was believed to be a secret passage used by dragons and sea spirits to move between sacred areas of the bay. Passing through the cave is sometimes described in folk narratives as crossing a symbolic boundary between different realms of nature.

== Conservation issues ==
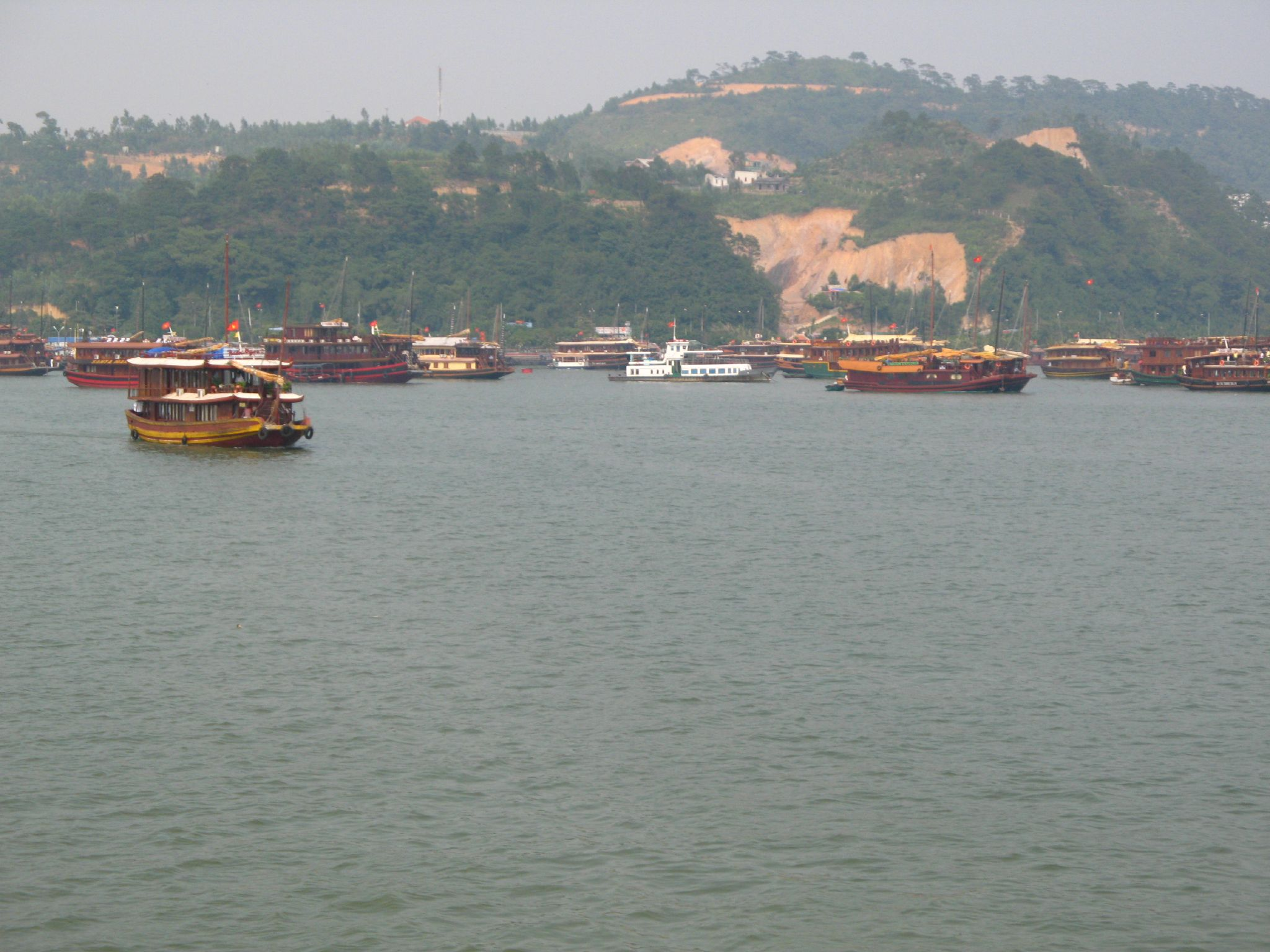
Tourism development in Ha Long Bay and its impact on the regional landscape

=== Impacts of human and natural factors on the bay area ===
Ha Long, Hai Phong, and Hanoi are significant urban centers driving the economic development in northern Vietnam. The economic growth in these urban areas, coupled with the rapid rise of the southern regions in China, including Hong Kong, have led to increasing human pressures on Ha Long Bay. The coastal areas of Quang Ninh province and Hai Phong City have experienced rapid growth in infrastructure development, particularly in transportation, shipping, coal mining, and tourism-related industries. Since 1999, the Asian Development Bank (ADB) has warned that constructing new ports in the Hạ Long Bay area could lead to increased maritime traffic in the region, posing threats to the bay's infrastructure and the social infrastructure supporting tourism. Pollution from industrial waste, overexploitation, and overfishing also pose significant threats. Some argue that there is a need for cautious consideration of development in the bay area through effective management structures, given its crucial environmental significance for the entire region.

Currently, the expansion of urban areas and population growth, construction of ports and factories, tourism and service activities, household and industrial waste, fishing and aquaculture practices, have not only become threats but have also caused alarming levels of environmental pollution and landscape changes in Ha Long Bay. Due to pollution, the once thriving coral reefs in the deep sea of Ha Long Bay are deteriorating. The formerly clear waters of the bay are increasingly becoming turbid and sedimented, prompting scientists to warn of the possibility of Ha Long Bay becoming "swamped." Additionally, as Ha Long Bay is surrounded by thousands of limestone islands, which are mostly good construction materials, they are susceptible to private exploitation, leading to landscape distortion.

On another aspect, global climate change with rising sea levels will strongly impact the landscape, island systems, caves, and biodiversity of Ha Long Bay. Vietnam currently lacks the necessary human and material resources to adequately respond to these challenges.

In terms of community culture, an issue that many International tourism have complained about is the lack of environmental awareness among both tourists and local communities. The modern, civilized, and courteous image of Ha Long tourism has not been fully established as desired. There are still instances of beggars harassing tourists, which affects the tourism environment of the heritage site. Efforts in education and propaganda to raise awareness among the local population, restrictions on resort development on islands, and the implementation of eco-tourism standards and heritage conservation regulations for the surrounding waters of the heritage site are significant challenges for the local government. The stalactites in the cave system of Ha Long Bay have been vandalized, cut, and taken away for use in decorating artificial landscapes (2016). Some caves have even been covered with concrete to serve as banquet venues. Moreover, the activities of fishing boats and tourists also generate significant amounts of waste pollution that the authorities have yet to effectively manage.

=== Conservation efforts ===
In an effort to prevent the negative impact of human activities on the natural environment of Ha Long Bay, the authorities of Quang Ninh province have prohibited high-speed motorboats serving tourists in the bay area to protect the environment and biodiversity. Additionally, the province has relocated fishing households living on floating villages to the mainland to protect the water environment of Ha Long Bay. Furthermore, the extraction of coal and stone within the heritage area has been banned to prevent coal and mud pollution in the bay as advised by UNESCO. In the bay area, some local residents have voluntarily taken action to preserve the landscape by organizing volunteer groups to collect and handle waste. Starting from September 1, 2019, the People's Committee of Ha Long City strictly banned the use of single-use plastic products in the bay area. This is a resolute and significant step towards conserving the bay's environment.

The similarity in landscape, geology, biodiversity, as well as cultural and archaeological values of the entire region, including not only Ha Long Bay but also Cat Ba Archipelago and Bai Tu Long Bay, has led to scientific research in geology, archaeology, culture, and tourism, as well as fishing activities, extending beyond the boundaries of Ha Long Bay. Some experts suggest considering the expansion of the conservation area, not only limiting it to the small area of Ha Long Bay but also encompassing the surrounding sea area, including the areas close to the Vietnam–China border. With a length of about 300 km and a width of about 60 km, the entire area can be seen and conserved as a unique marine ecosystem of Vietnam.

== See also ==
- El Nido
- Guilin
- Krabi
- Matsushima
