= Cladocroce =

Scientific classification
- Kingdom: Animalia
- Phylum: Porifera
- Class: Demospongiae
- Order: Haplosclerida
- Family: Chalinidae
- Genus: Cladocroce; Topsent, 1892

Genus of sponges

Cladocroce is a genus of demosponges in the family Chalinidae.

== Species ==
- Cladocroce aculeata Pulitzer-Finali, 1982
- Cladocroce attu Lehnert & Stone, 2013
- Cladocroce burapha Putchakarn, de Weerdt, Sonchaeng & van Soest, 2004
- Cladocroce caelum Santos, Da Silva, Alliz & Pinheiro, 2014
- Cladocroce fibrosa (Topsent, 1890)
- Cladocroce gaussiana (Hentschel, 1914)
- Cladocroce guyanensis Van Soest, 2017
- Cladocroce hyalina (Lundbeck, 1902)
- Cladocroce incurvata Lévi & Lévi, 1983
- Cladocroce infundibulum Lehnert & Stone, 2013
- Cladocroce kiska Lehnert & Stone, 2013
- Cladocroce osculosa Topsent, 1927
- Cladocroce parenchyma (Lundbeck, 1902)
- Cladocroce reina Aguilar-Camacho & Carballo, 2010
- Cladocroce spathiformis Topsent, 1904
- Cladocroce spatula (Lundbeck, 1902)
- Cladocroce toxifera Lehnert & Stone, 2016
- Cladocroce tubulosa Pulitzer-Finali, 1993
- Cladocroce ventilabrum (Fristedt, 1887)
- Cladocroce pansinii Bertolino & Calcinai, 2023
