= Cladocroce pansinii =

Scientific classification
- Domain: Eukaryota
- Kingdom: Animalia
- Phylum: Porifera
- Class: Demospongiae
- Order: Haplosclerida
- Family: Chalinidae
- Genus: Cladocroce
- Species: C. pansinii

Binomial name
- Cladocroce pansinii Bertolino & Calcinai, 2023

Species of sponge

Cladocroce pansinii is a species of sponge discovered in 2023 in Vietnam. The species is "rather common in Hạ Long Bay". Samples of the same species may have been collected in Hawaii around 2020.
