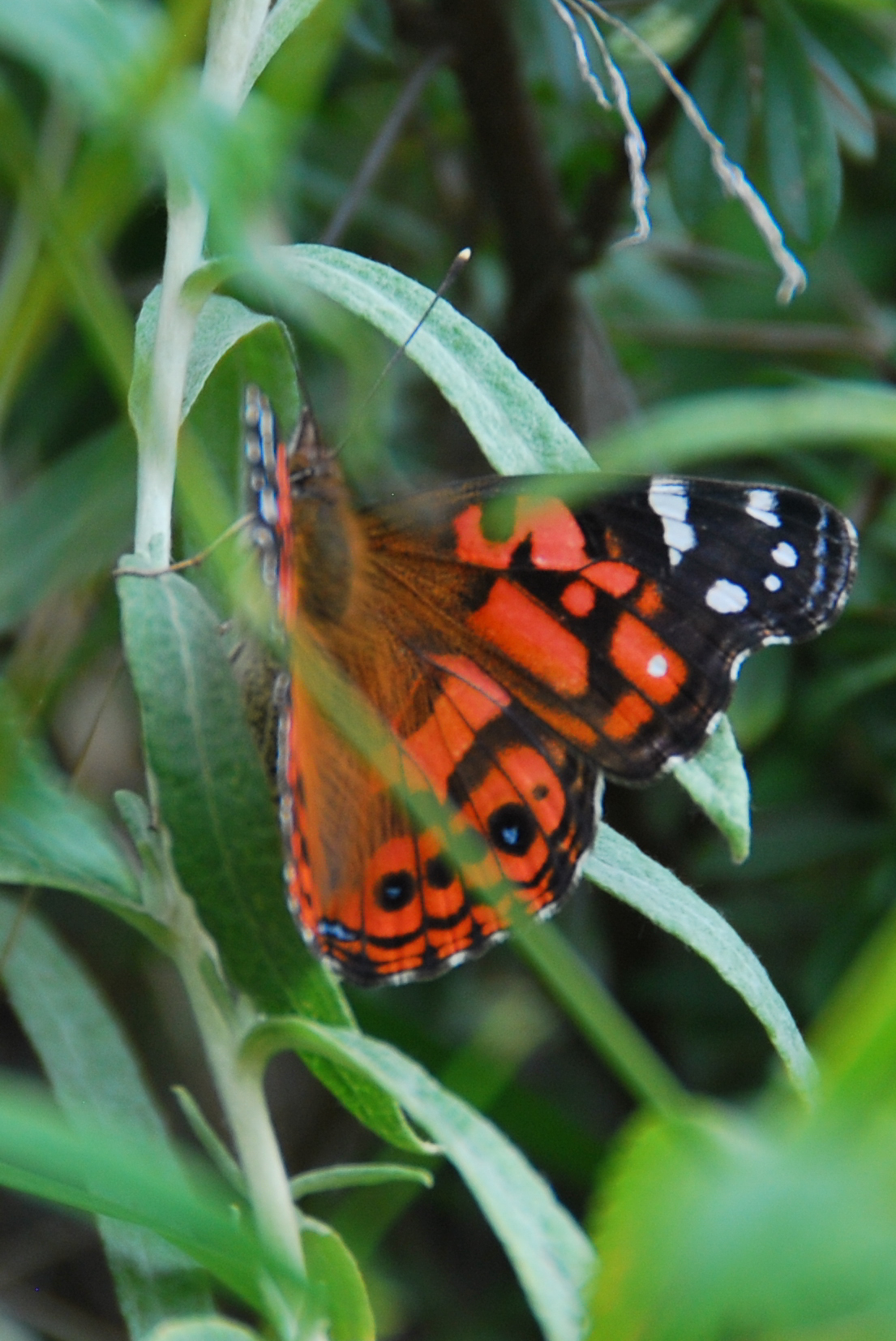

Scientific classification
- Kingdom: Animalia
- Phylum: Arthropoda
- Clade: Pancrustacea
- Class: Insecta
- Order: Lepidoptera
- Family: Nymphalidae
- Genus: Vanessa
- Species: V. altissima

Binomial name
- Vanessa altissima (Rosenberg & Talbot, 1914)

Synonyms
- Pyrameis huntera altissima Rosenberg & Talbot, 1914

= Vanessa altissima =

Andean painted lady

Species of butterfly

Vanessa altissima, the Andean painted lady, is a butterfly of the family Nymphalidae found in Ecuador and Peru.
