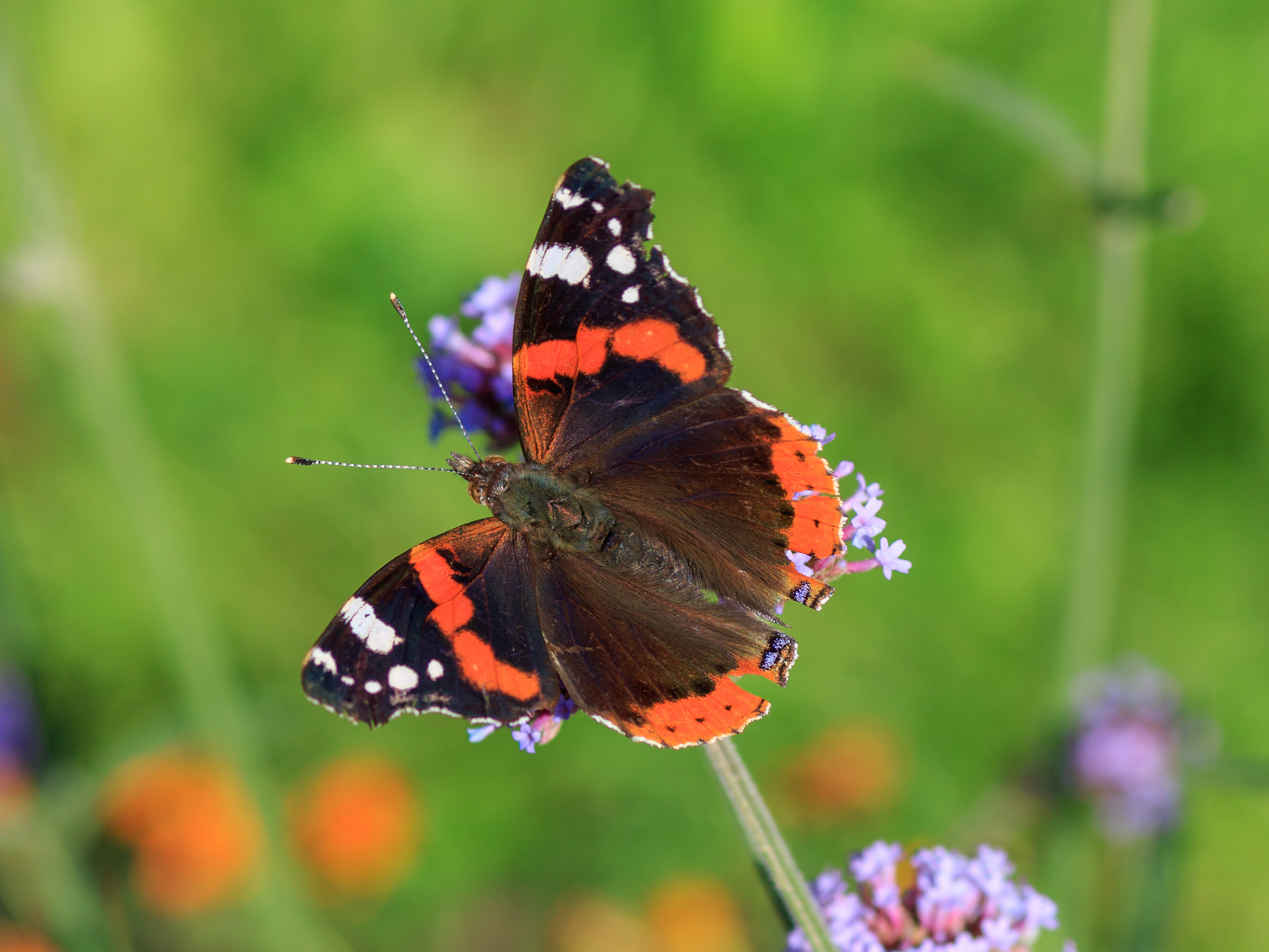
- Red admiral, Vanessa atalanta
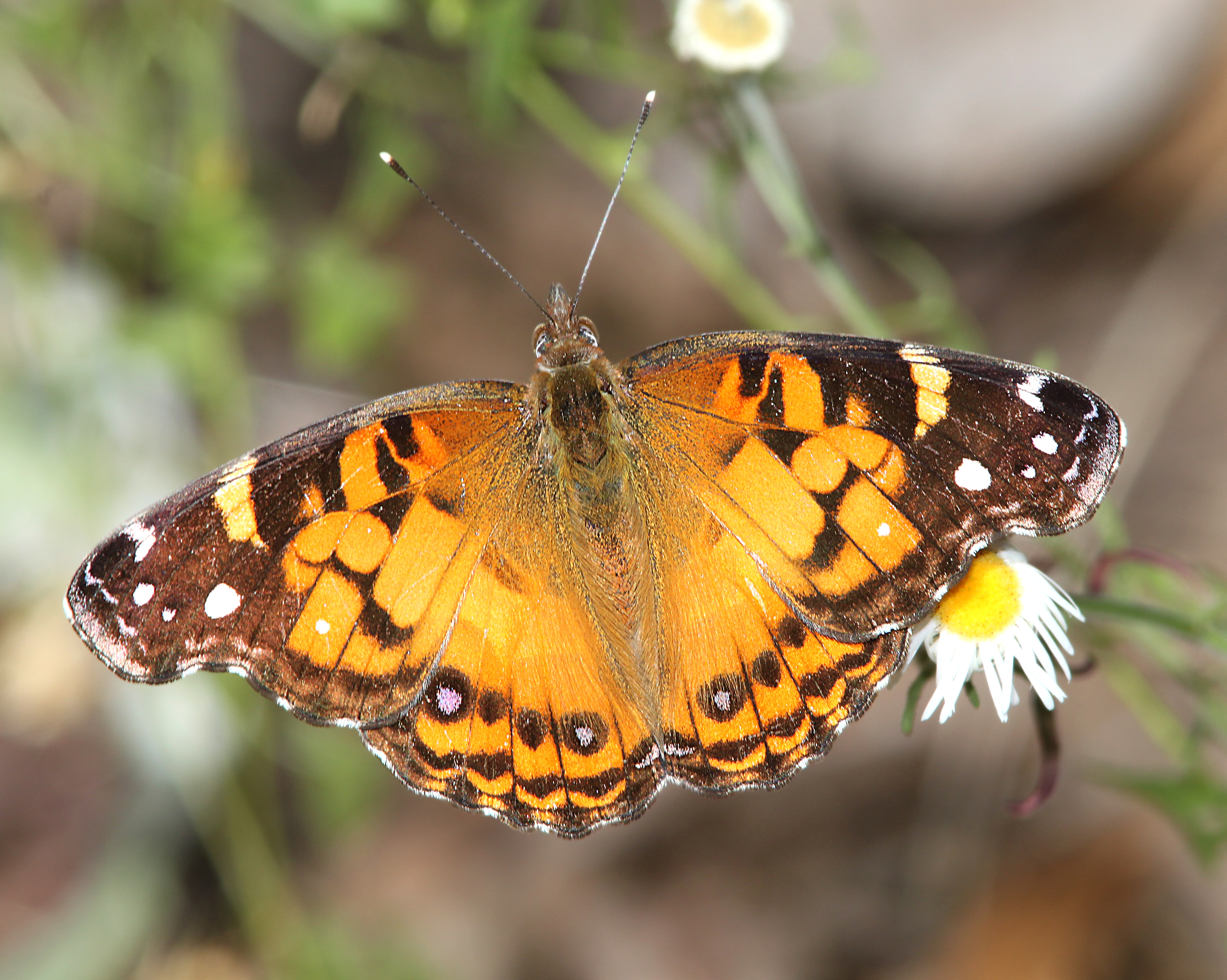
- American lady, Vanessa virginiensis

Scientific classification
- Kingdom: Animalia
- Phylum: Arthropoda
- Clade: Pancrustacea
- Class: Insecta
- Order: Lepidoptera
- Family: Nymphalidae
- Tribe: Nymphalini
- Genus: Vanessa; Fabricius, 1807

Synonyms
- Fieldia (Niculescu, 1979); Cynthia (Fabricius, 1807); Pyrameis (Hübner, 1819); Bassaris (Hübner, 1821); Ammiralis (Rennie, 1832); Neopyrameis (Scudder, 1889)

= Vanessa (butterfly) =

Vanessa Temporal range: Chadronian-Holocene 37.2–0 Ma

Genus of brush-footed butterflies

Vanessa is a genus of brush-footed butterflies in the tribe Nymphalini. It has a near-global distribution and includes conspicuous species such as the red admirals (e.g., red admiral, Indian red admiral, New Zealand red admiral), the Kamehameha, and the painted ladies of the Cynthia group (formerly a subgenus): Painted lady, American painted lady, West Coast lady, Australian painted lady, etc. For African admirals, see genus Antanartia. Recently, several members traditionally considered to be in the genus Antanartia have been determined to belong within the genus Vanessa.

The name of the genus may have been taken from the character Vanessa in Jonathan Swift's poem "Cadenus and Vanessa," which is the source of the woman's name Vanessa. In the poem Vanessa is called a "nymph" eleven times, and the genus is closely related to the previously named genus Nymphalis. Though the name has been suggested to be a variant of "Phanessa", from the name of an Ancient Greek deity, this is unlikely. The name of the deity is actually not "Phanessa" but Phanes. Johan Christian Fabricius, the entomologist who named this genus, normally used the original forms of the names of classical divinities when he created new scientific names.

North American species in the genus Vanessa overwinter as adults.

== Species ==
The 22 extant species are:

- Vanessa abyssinica (C. & R. Felder, 1867) – Abyssinian admiral
- Vanessa altissima (Rosenberg & Talbot, 1914) – Andean painted lady
- Vanessa annabella (Field, 1971) – West Coast lady
- Vanessa atalanta (Linnaeus, 1758) – red admiral
- Vanessa braziliensis (Moore, 1883) – Brazilian painted lady
- Vanessa buana (Fruhstorfer, 1898) – Lompobatang lady
- Vanessa cardui (Linnaeus, 1758) – painted lady or cosmopolitan
- Vanessa carye (Hübner, [1812]) – western painted lady
- Vanessa dejeanii Godart, 1824
- Vanessa dilecta Hanafusa, 1992
- Vanessa dimorphica (Howarth, 1966) – dimorphic admiral or northern short-tailed admiral
- Vanessa gonerilla (Fabricius, 1775) – New Zealand red admiral
- Vanessa hippomene (Hübner, 1823) – southern short-tailed admiral
- Vanessa indica (Herbst, 1794) – Indian red admiral or Asian admiral
- Vanessa itea (Fabricius, 1775) – Australian or yellow admiral
- Vanessa kershawi (McCoy, 1868) – Australian painted lady
- Vanessa myrinna (Doubleday, 1849) – vivid banded lady or banded lady
- Vanessa samani (Hagen, 1895)
- Vanessa tameamea (Eschscholtz, 1821) – Kamehameha butterfly
- Vanessa terpsichore Philipi, 1859 – Chilean lady
- Vanessa virginiensis (Drury, [1773]) – American lady or American painted lady
- Vanessa vulcania (Godart, 1819) – Canary red admiral
Comparison of admirals and painted ladies

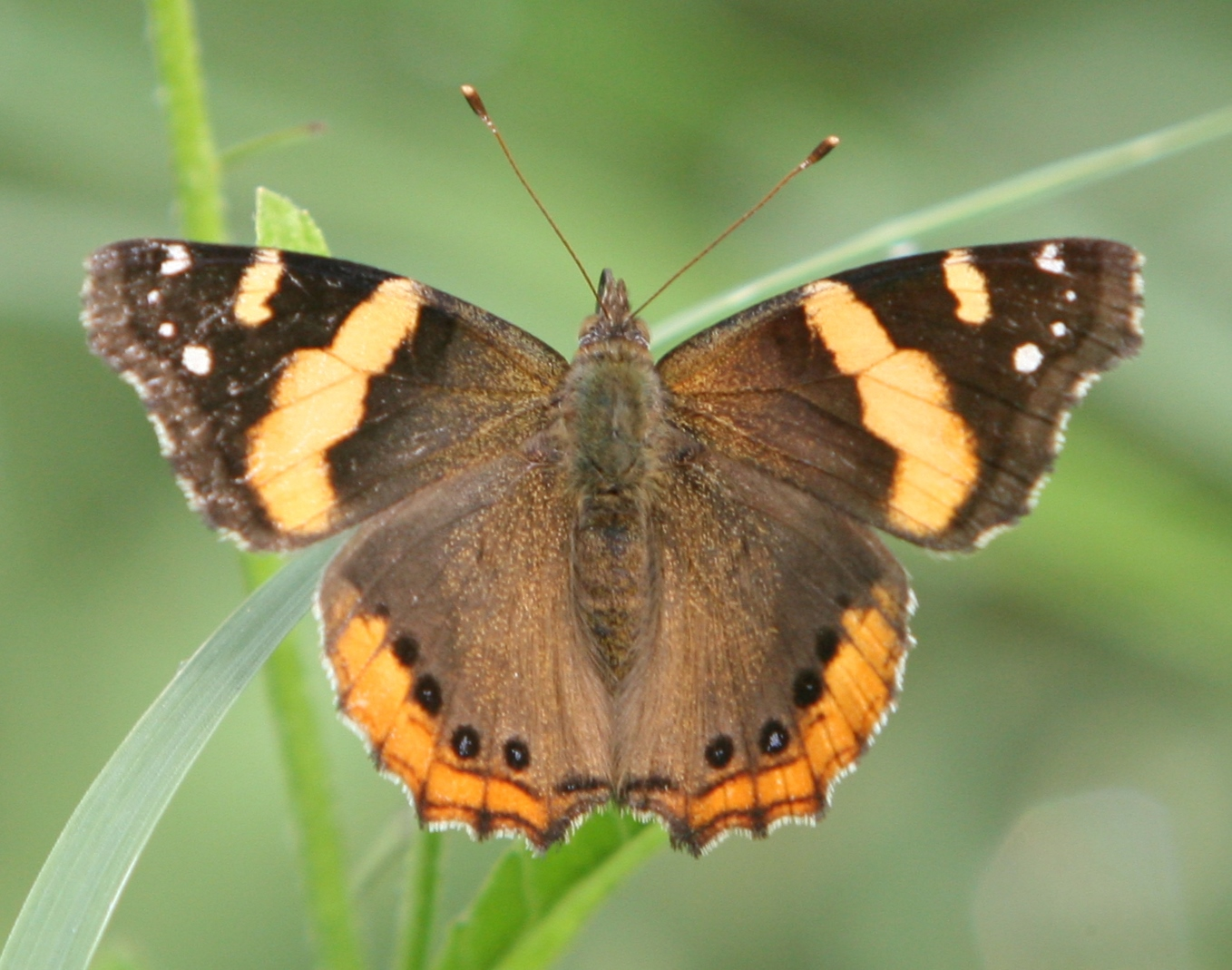
Vanessa abyssinica,
Abyssinian admiral

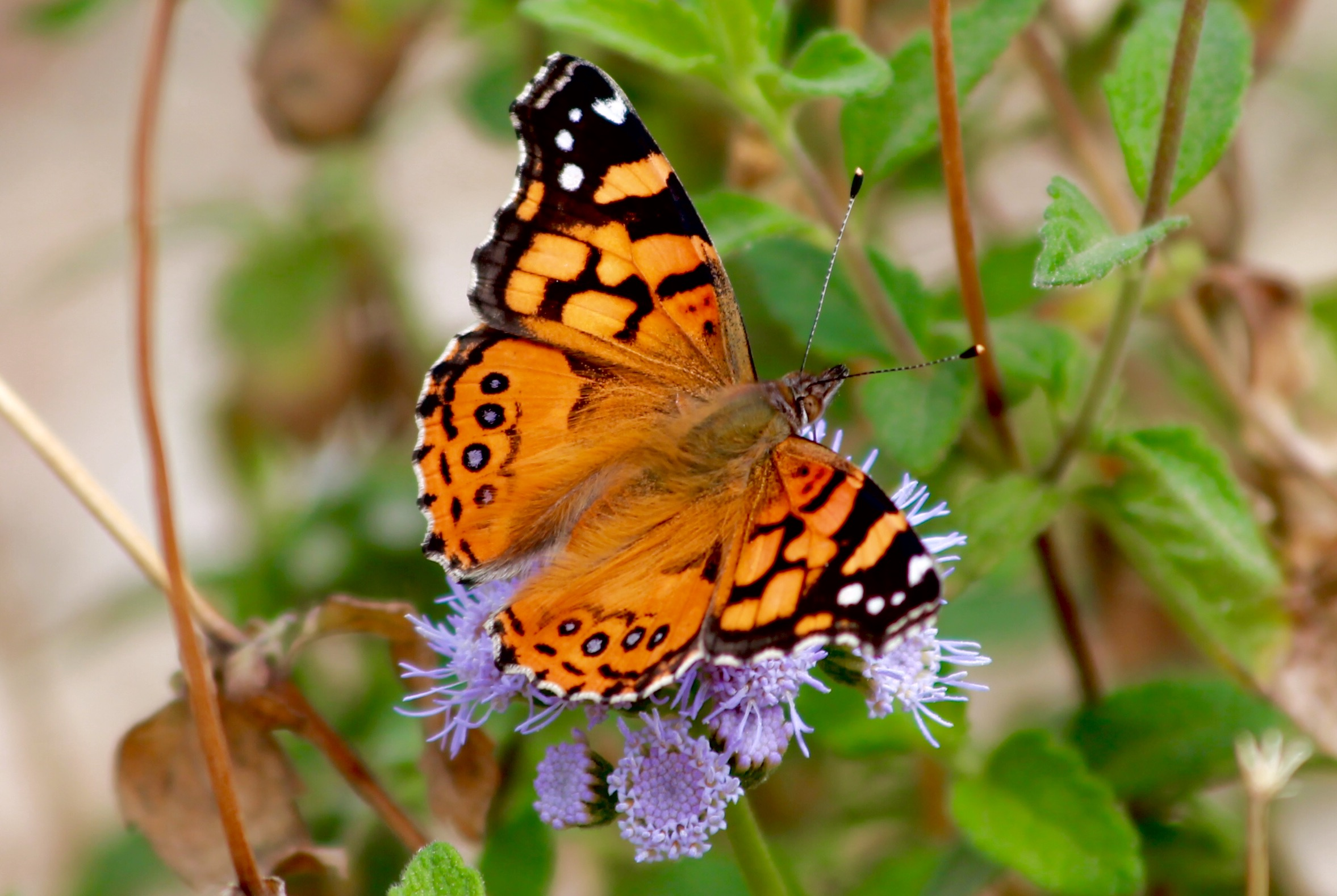
Vanessa annabella,
West Coast lady

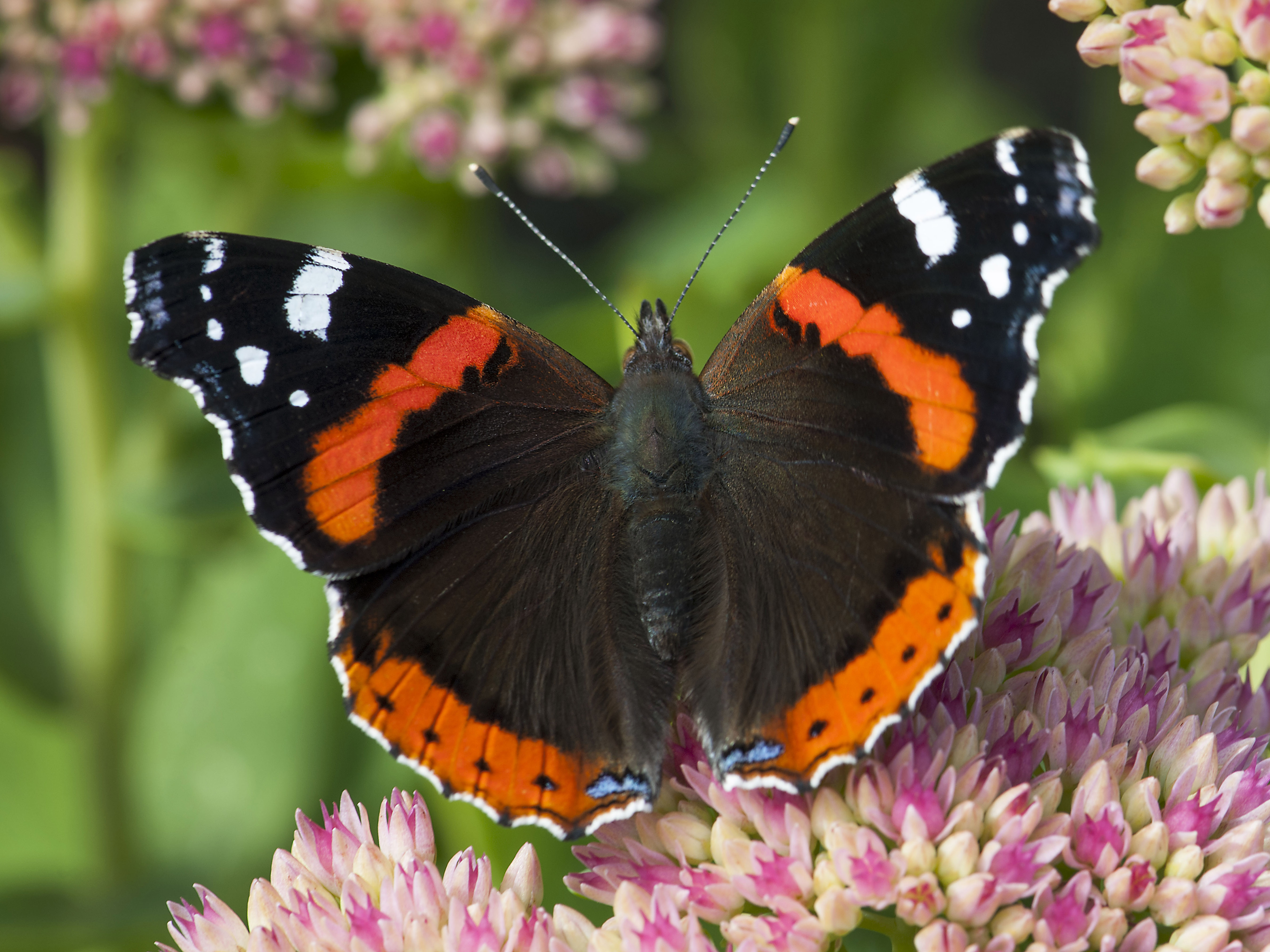
Vanessa atalanta,
red admiral

Vanessa braziliensis,
Brazilian painted lady

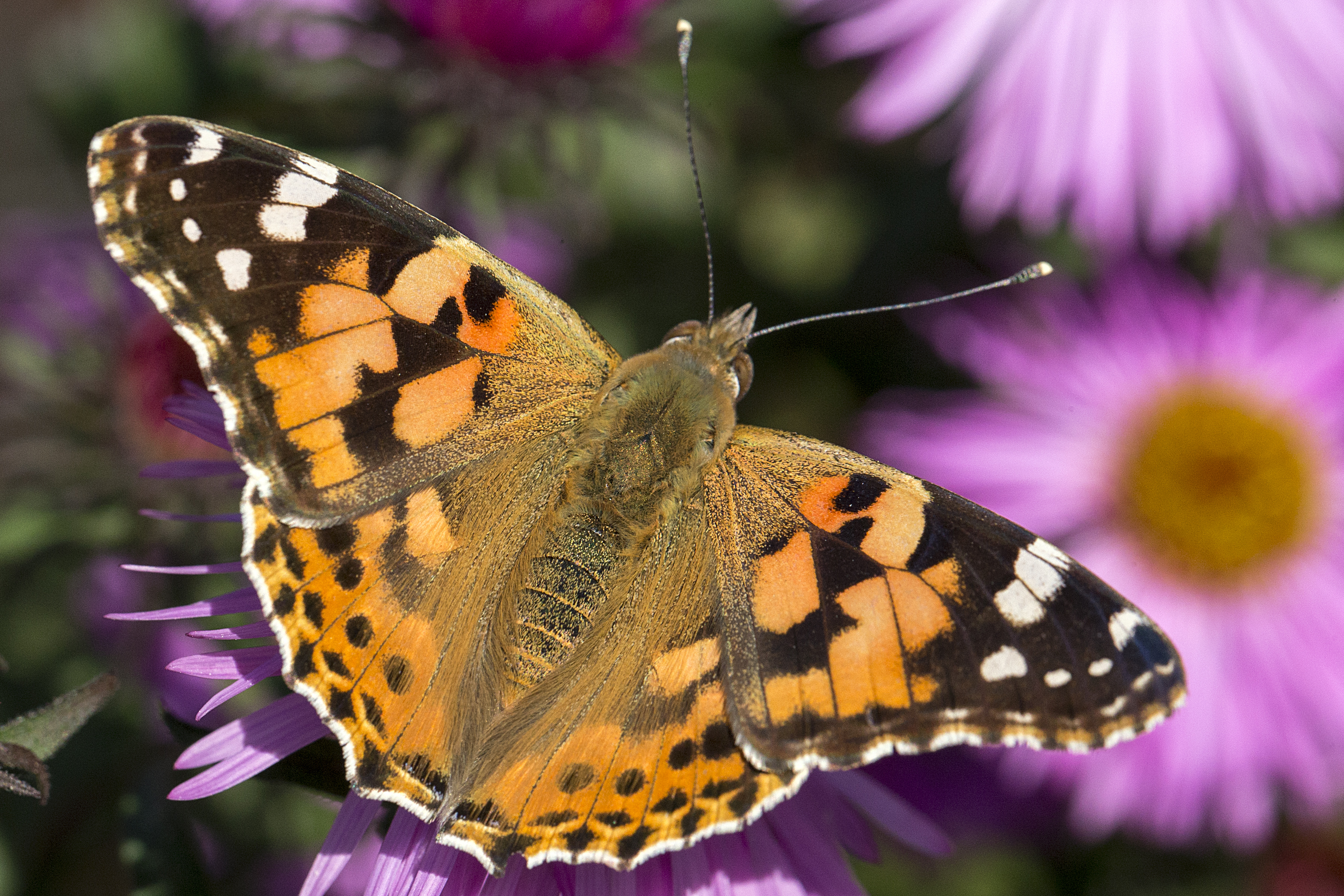
Vanessa cardui,
painted lady

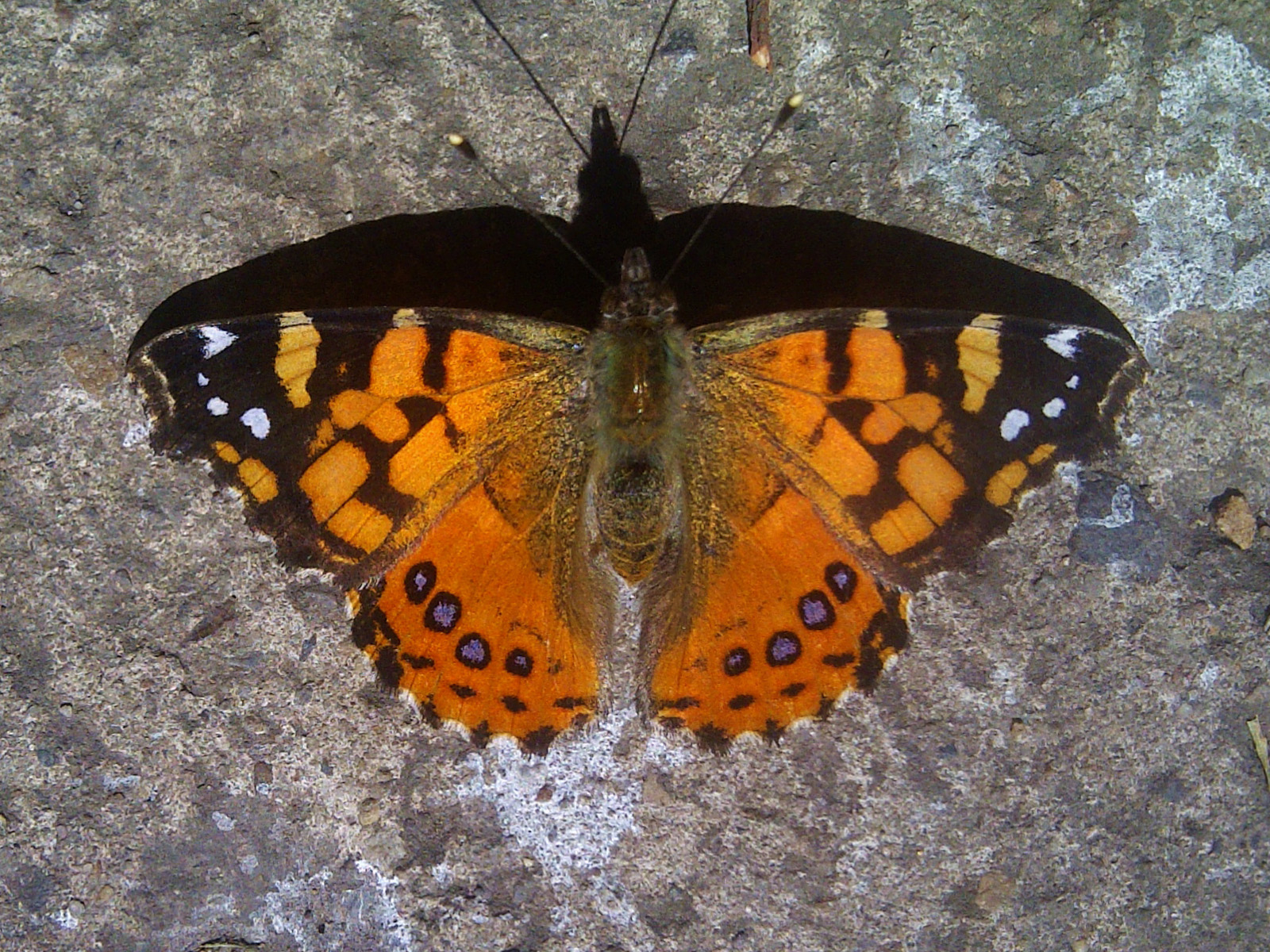
Vanessa carye,
western painted lady

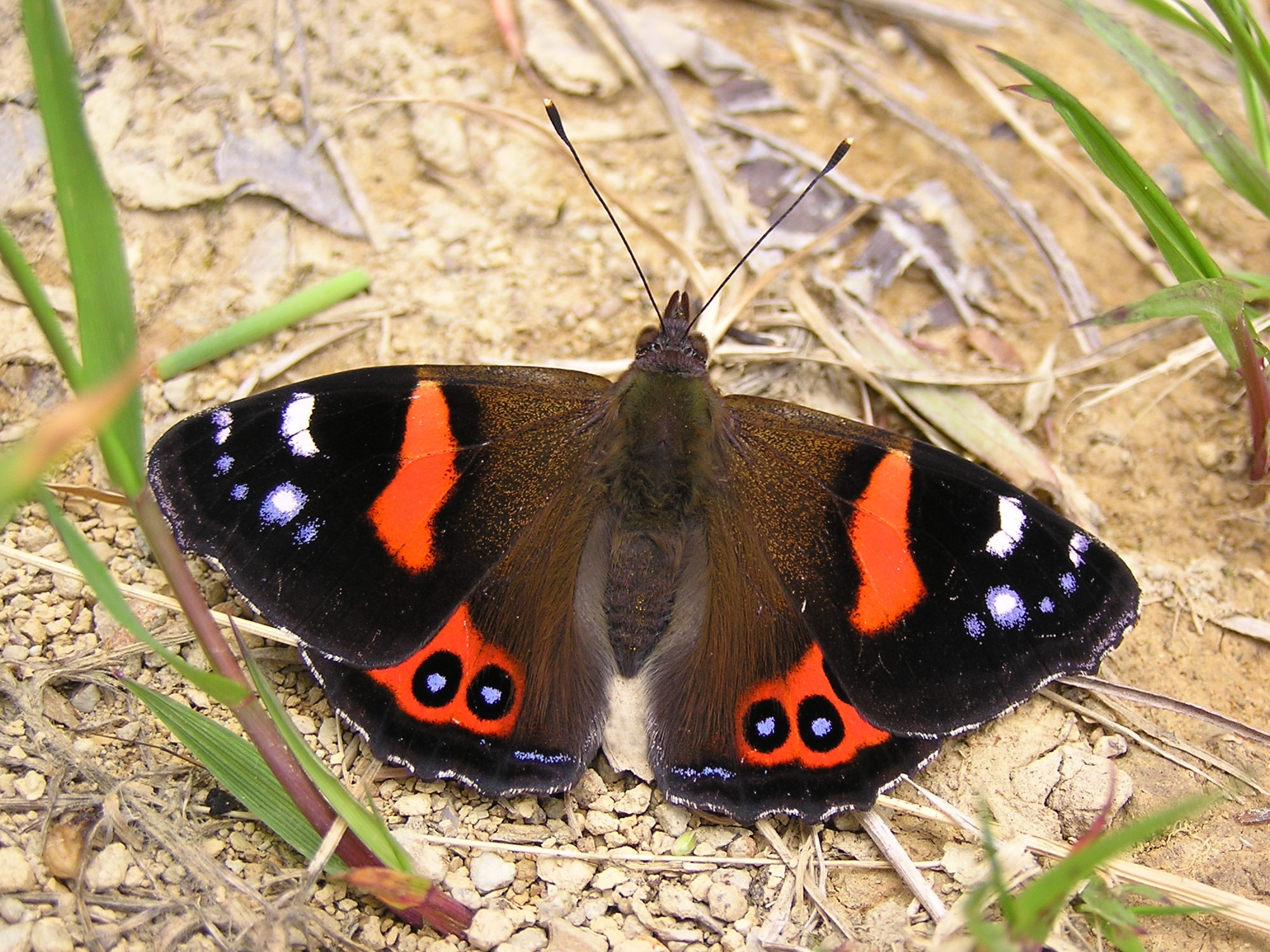
Vanessa gonerilla,
New Zealand red admiral

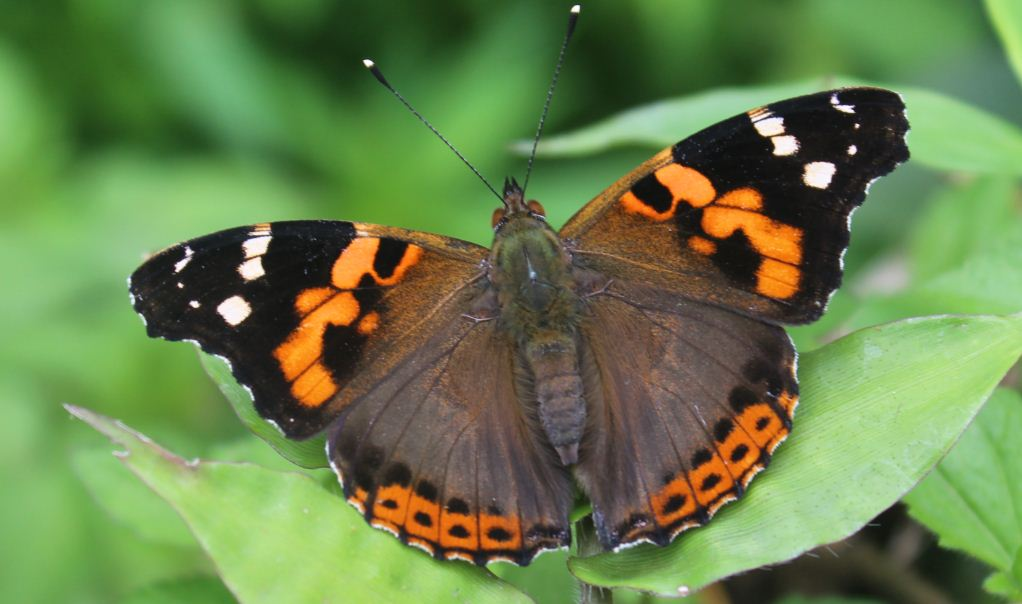
Vanessa indica,
Indian red admiral

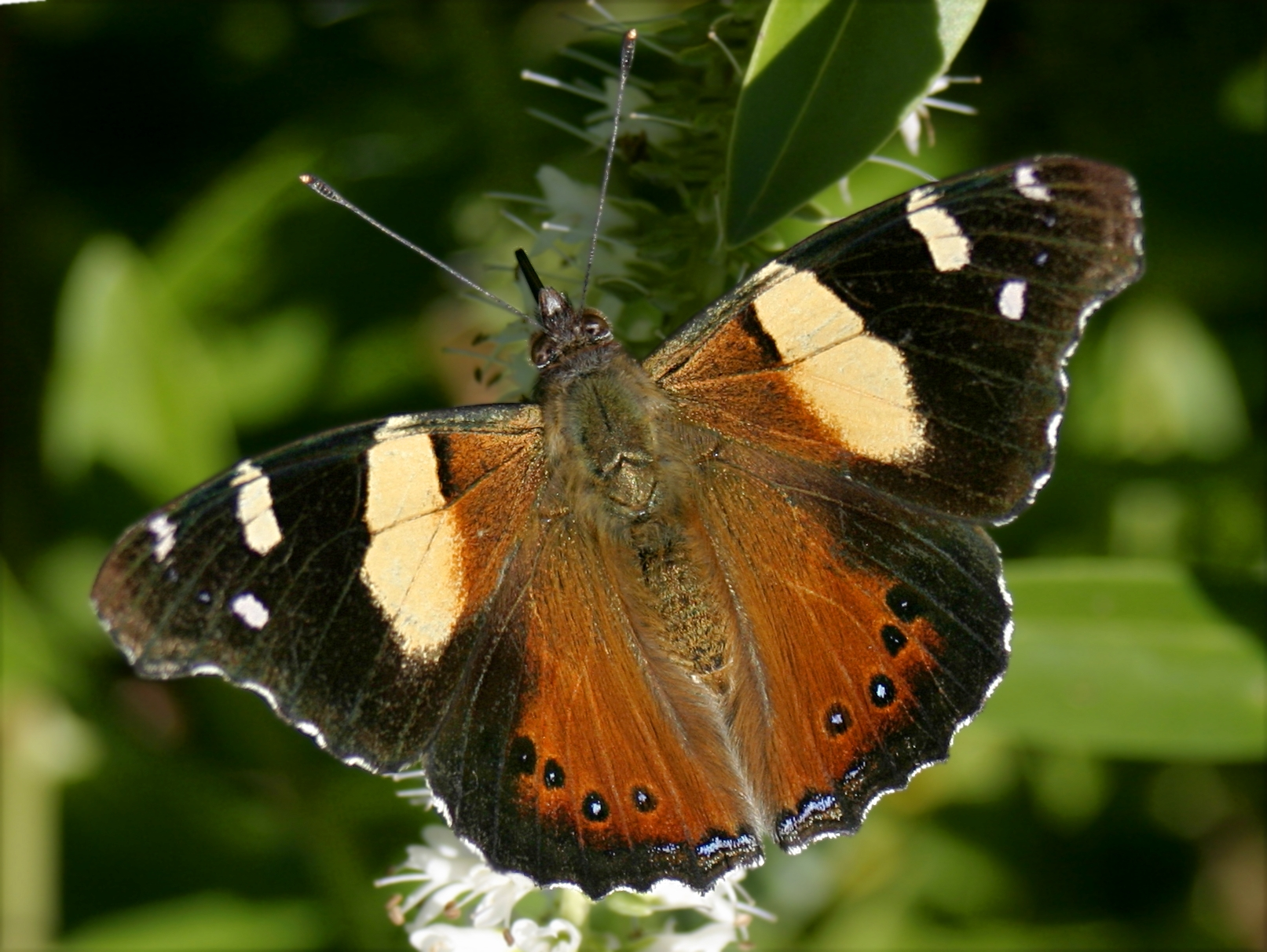
Vanessa itea,
yellow admiral

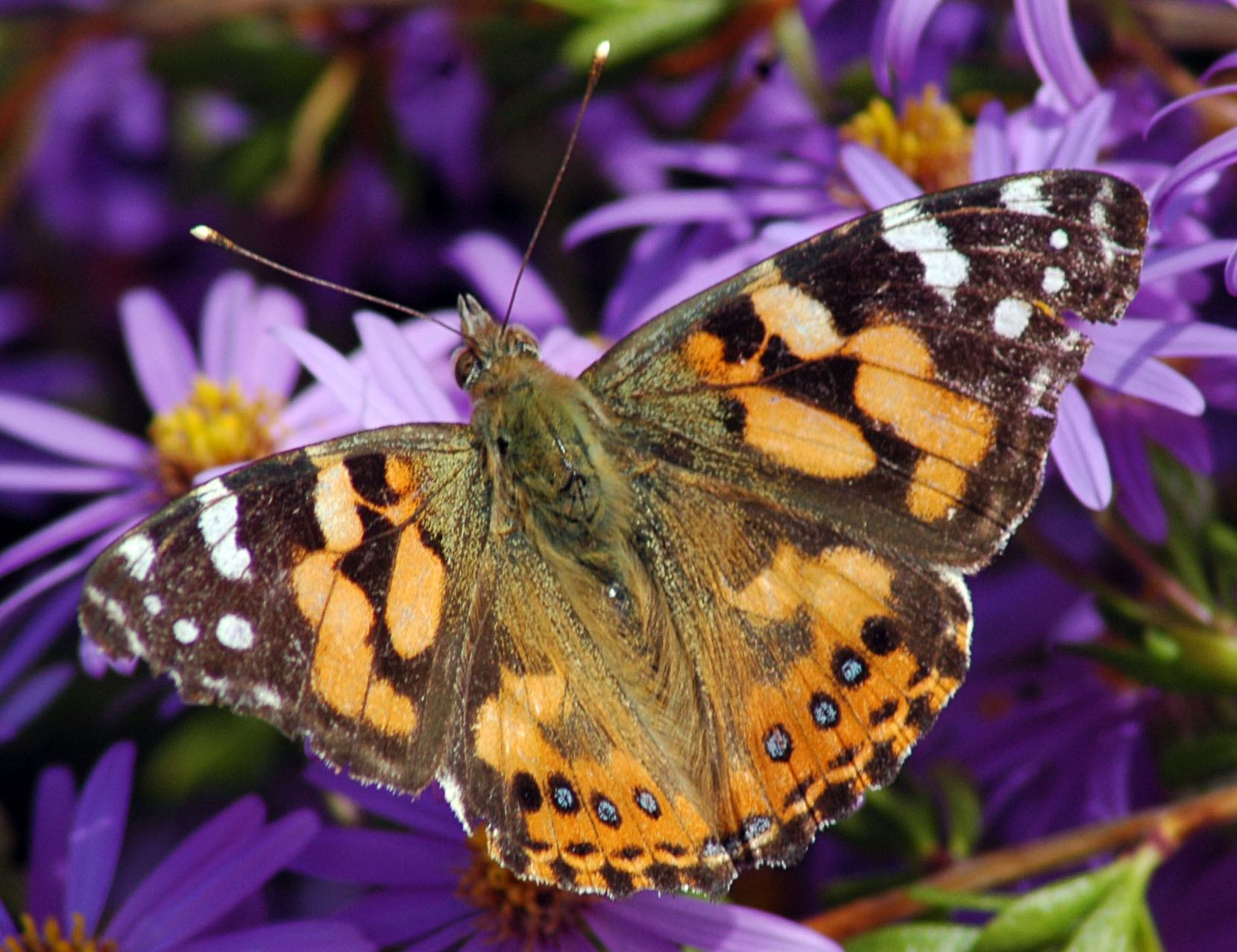
Vanessa kershawi,
Australian painted lady

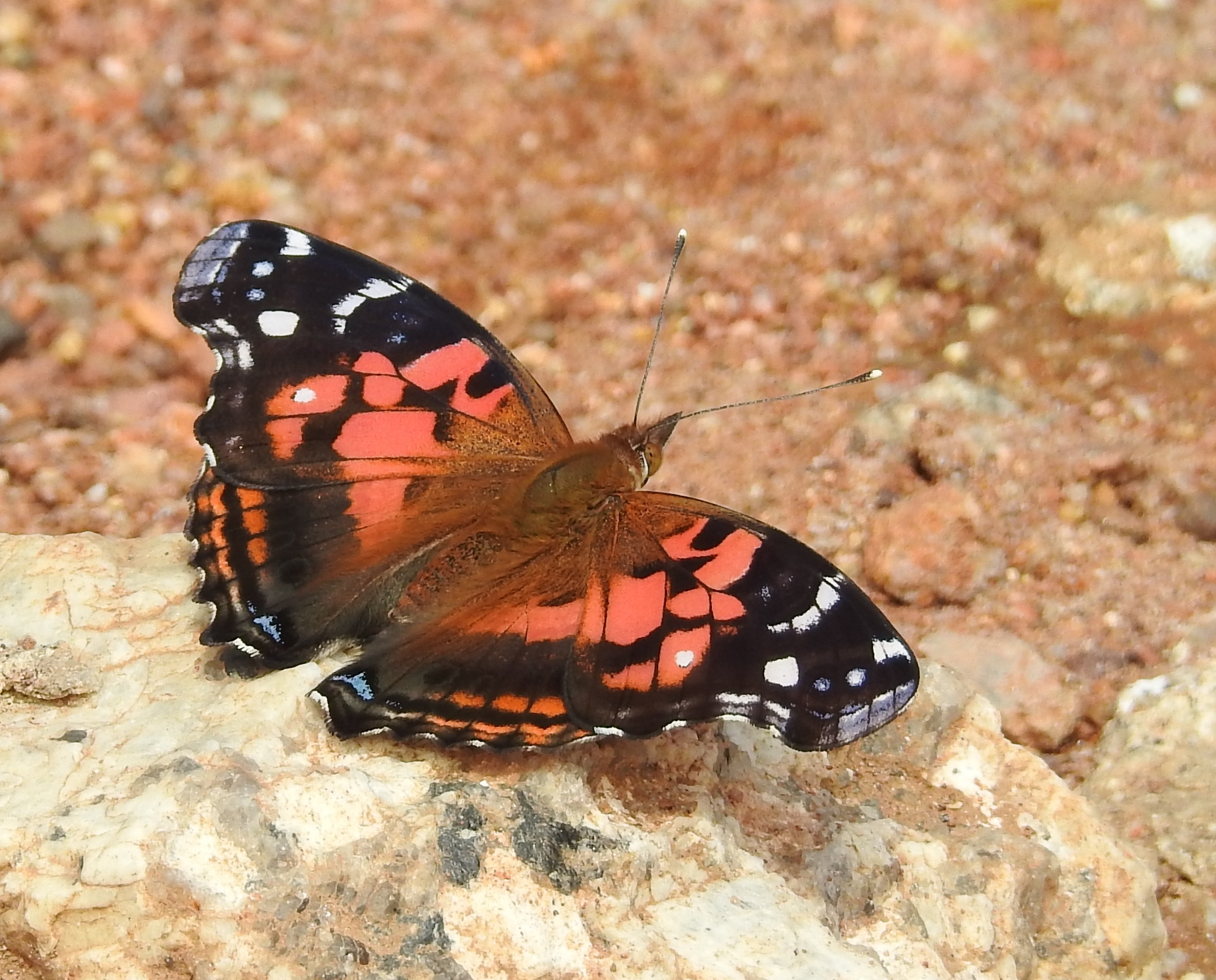
Vanessa myrinna,
banded lady

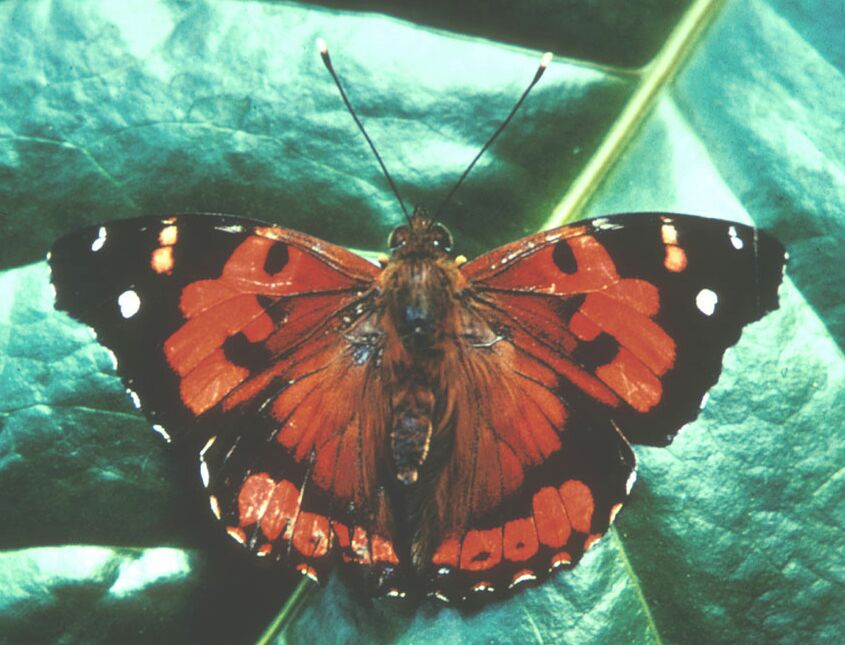
Vanessa tameamea,
Kamehameha butterfly

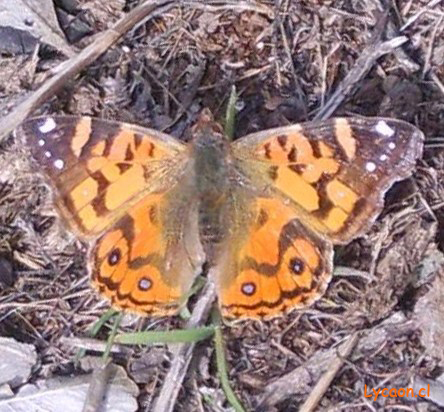
Vanessa terpsichore,
Chilean lady

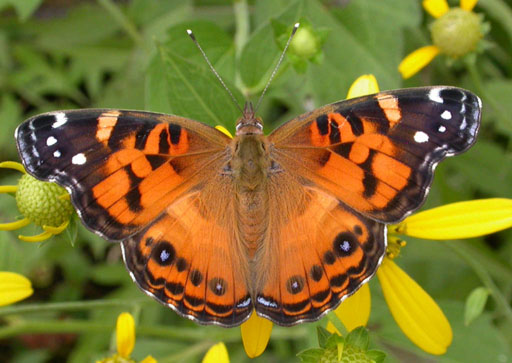
Vanessa virginiensis,
American painted lady

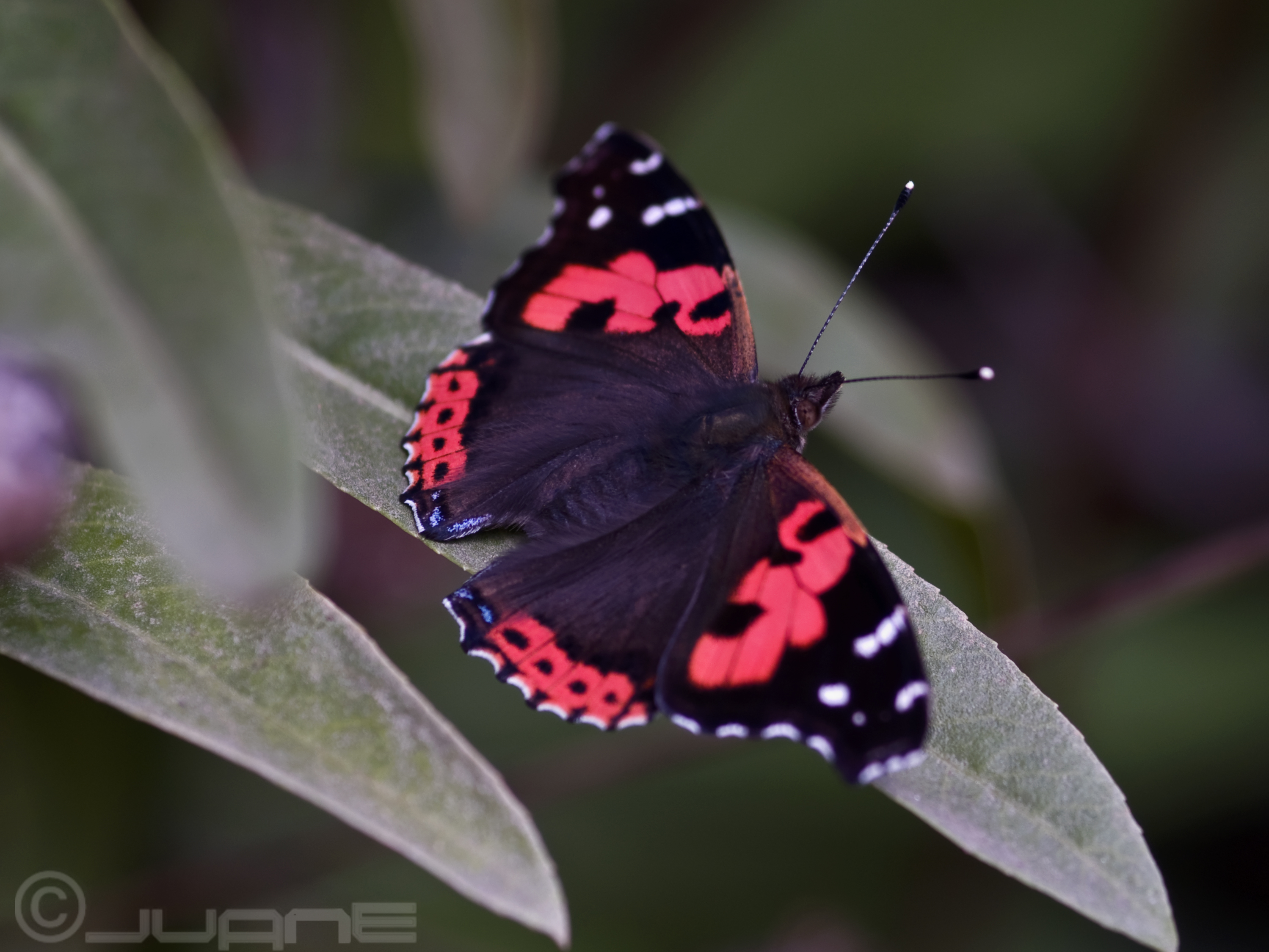
Vanessa vulcania,
Canary red admiral

=== Fossil species ===
A fossil species, V. amerindica, is known from a specimen found in the Chadronian-aged Florissant Lagerstatte, from Late Eocene Colorado, and coexisted with several other extinct butterfly taxa.
