= Vanessa dilecta =

Scientific classification
- Domain: Eukaryota
- Kingdom: Animalia
- Phylum: Arthropoda
- Class: Insecta
- Order: Lepidoptera
- Family: Nymphalidae
- Genus: Vanessa
- Species: V. dilecta

Binomial name
- Vanessa dilecta Hanafusa, 1992

Synonyms
- Vanessa dilekta

Species of butterfly

Vanessa dilecta is a butterfly of the family Nymphalidae. The type locality is West Timor. It is sister to Vanessa buana and is sometimes lumped with that species.
