= Vanessa amerindica =

Vanessa amerindica Temporal range: Early Oligocene

Scientific classification
- Kingdom: Animalia
- Phylum: Arthropoda
- Clade: Pancrustacea
- Class: Insecta
- Order: Lepidoptera
- Family: Nymphalidae
- Genus: Vanessa
- Species: †V. amerindica

Binomial name
- †Vanessa amerindica Miller & Brown, 1989

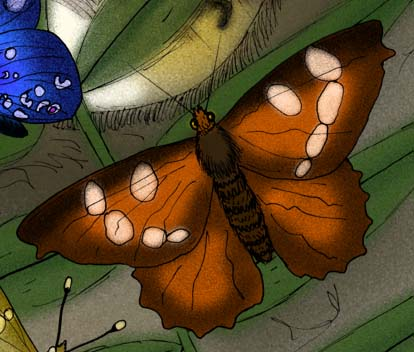
Reconstruction of Vanessa amerindica, an extinct butterfly from the Chadronian-aged Florissant, of Latest Eocene Colorado.

Vanessa amerindica was a species of butterfly in the genus Vanessa that is extinct and was discovered as fossils.
