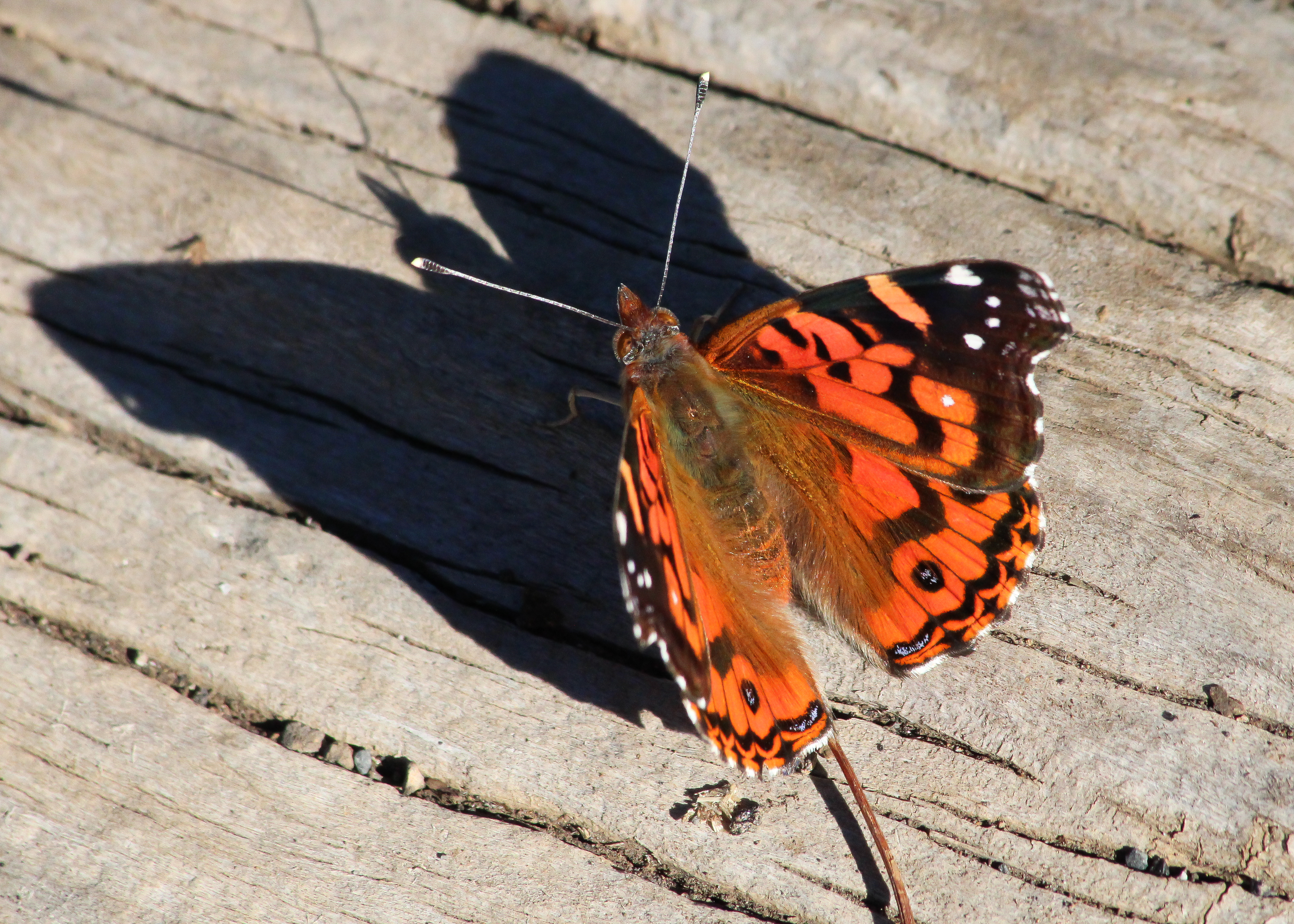

Scientific classification
- Kingdom: Animalia
- Phylum: Arthropoda
- Class: Insecta
- Order: Lepidoptera
- Family: Nymphalidae
- Genus: Vanessa
- Species: V. terpsichore

Binomial name
- Vanessa terpsichore Philipi, 1859

= Vanessa terpsichore =

Chilean lady

Species of butterfly

Vanessa terpsichore, the Chilean lady, is a butterfly of the family Nymphalidae. It is found in Chile.
