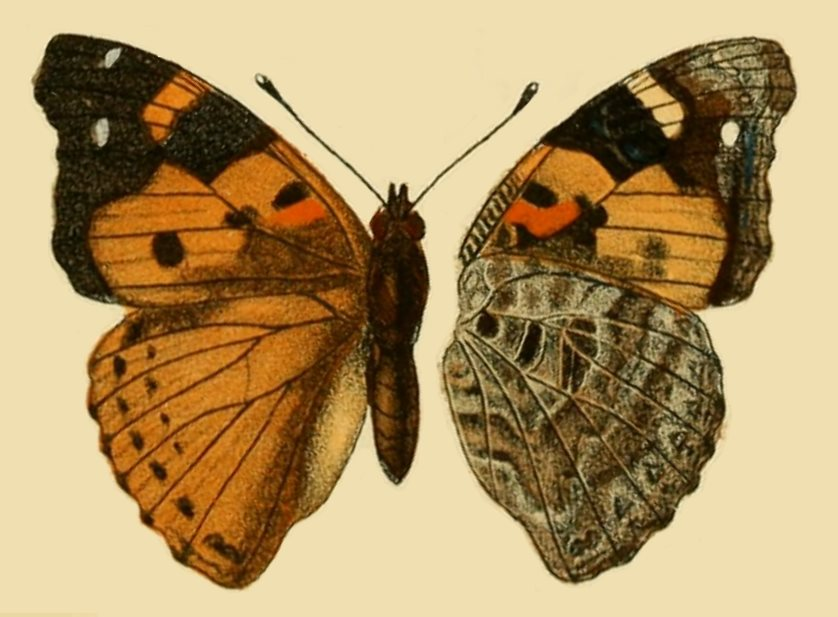

Scientific classification
- Domain: Eukaryota
- Kingdom: Animalia
- Phylum: Arthropoda
- Class: Insecta
- Order: Lepidoptera
- Family: Nymphalidae
- Genus: Vanessa
- Species: V. samani

Binomial name
- Vanessa samani (Hagen, 1895)

Synonyms
- Pyrameis samani Hagen, 1895

= Vanessa samani =

Species of butterfly

Vanessa samani is a butterfly of the family Nymphalidae found on Sumatra, where it has been recorded from Mount Kerinci and the Karo Mountains.
