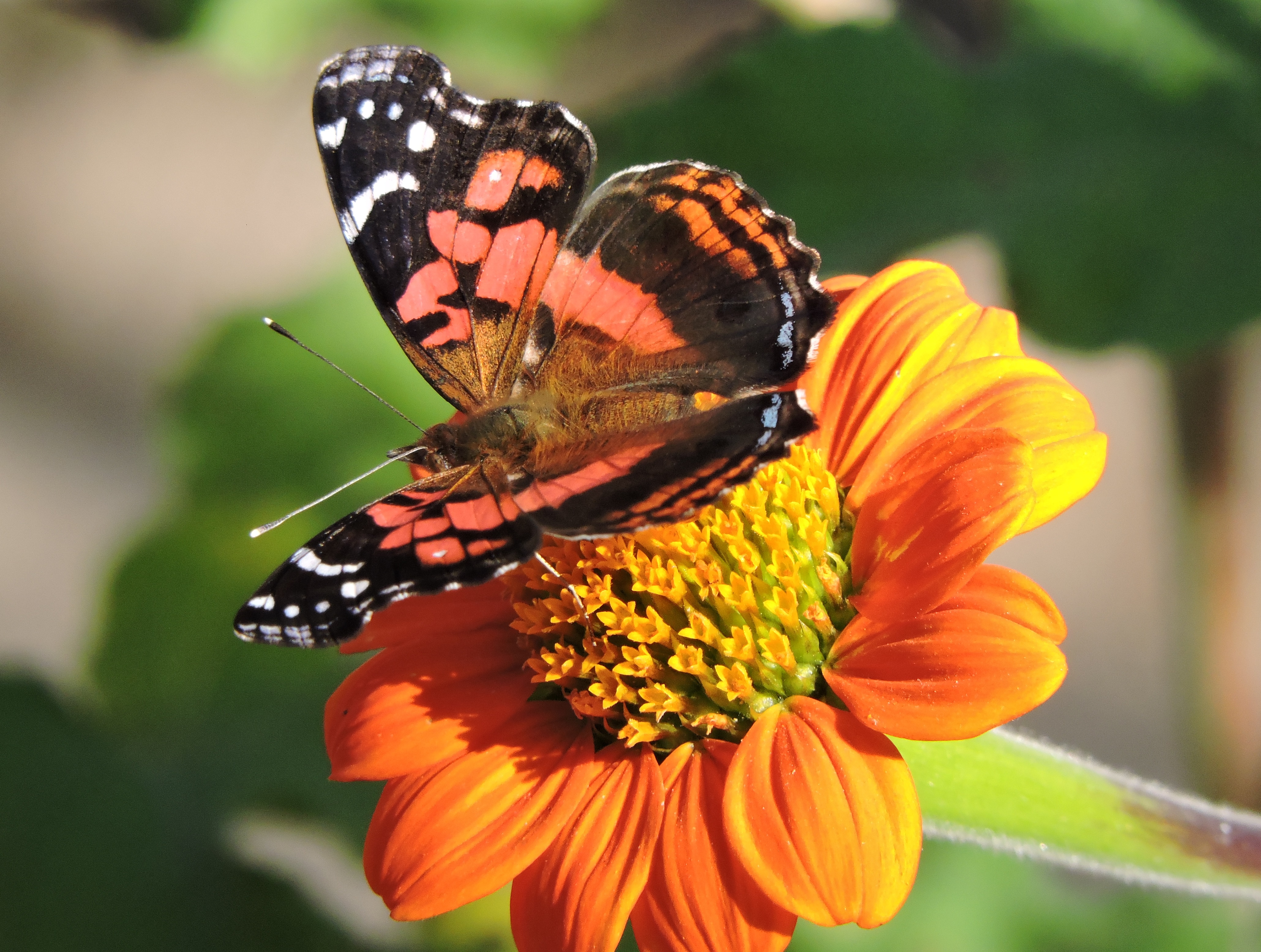

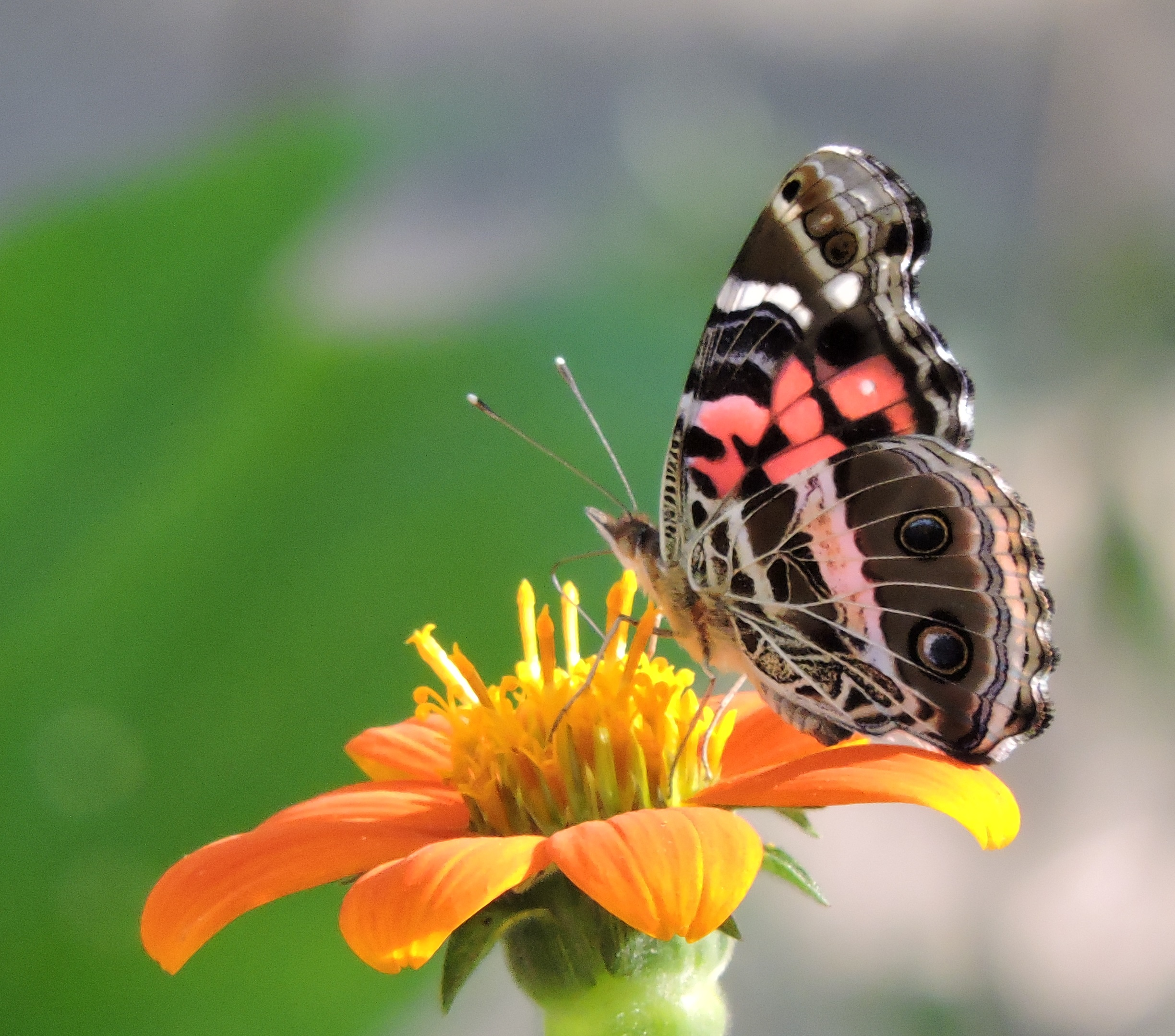
- V. myrinna in southern Brasil

Scientific classification
- Domain: Eukaryota
- Kingdom: Animalia
- Phylum: Arthropoda
- Class: Insecta
- Order: Lepidoptera
- Family: Nymphalidae
- Genus: Vanessa
- Species: V. myrinna

Binomial name
- Vanessa myrinna Doubleday, 1849

Synonyms
- Pyrameis myrinna Doubleday, 1849; Vanessa syngenesiae Capronnier, 1874; Pyrameis myrinna ab. incarnata Seitz, 1914; Pyrameis myrinna ab. eunice Hall, 1917; Pyrameis myrinna ab. merlinde Zikán, 1937

= Vanessa myrinna =

Vivid painted lady

Species of butterfly

Vanessa myrinna, the vivid painted lady or banded lady, is a butterfly of the family Nymphalidae found in Peru, Ecuador, Chile, Brazil and Colombia.
