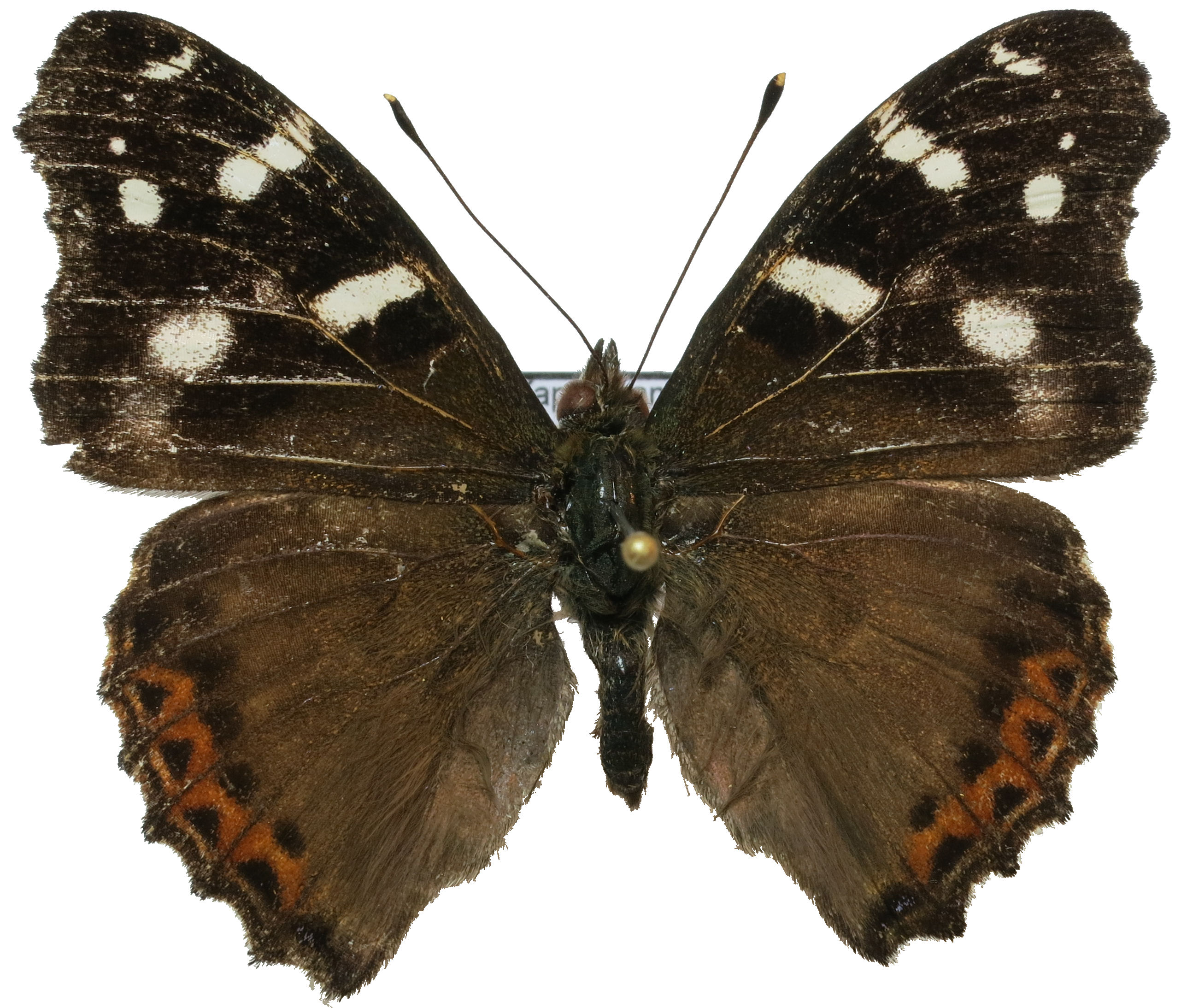

Scientific classification
- Domain: Eukaryota
- Kingdom: Animalia
- Phylum: Arthropoda
- Class: Insecta
- Order: Lepidoptera
- Family: Nymphalidae
- Genus: Vanessa
- Species: V. dejeanii

Binomial name
- Vanessa dejeanii Godart, [1824]

Synonyms
- Pyrameis dejeani sambaluna Fruhstorfer, 1898; Pyrameis dejeani mounseyi Talbot, 1936

= Vanessa dejeanii =

Species of butterfly

Vanessa dejeanii is a butterfly of the family Nymphalidae found in the Philippines and on Java, Lombok and Bali.

== Subspecies ==
- Vanessa dejeanii dejeanii (Java, Bali, Lombok)
- Vanessa dejeanii mounseyi (Talbot, 1936) (Philippines: Mindanao, Samar)
