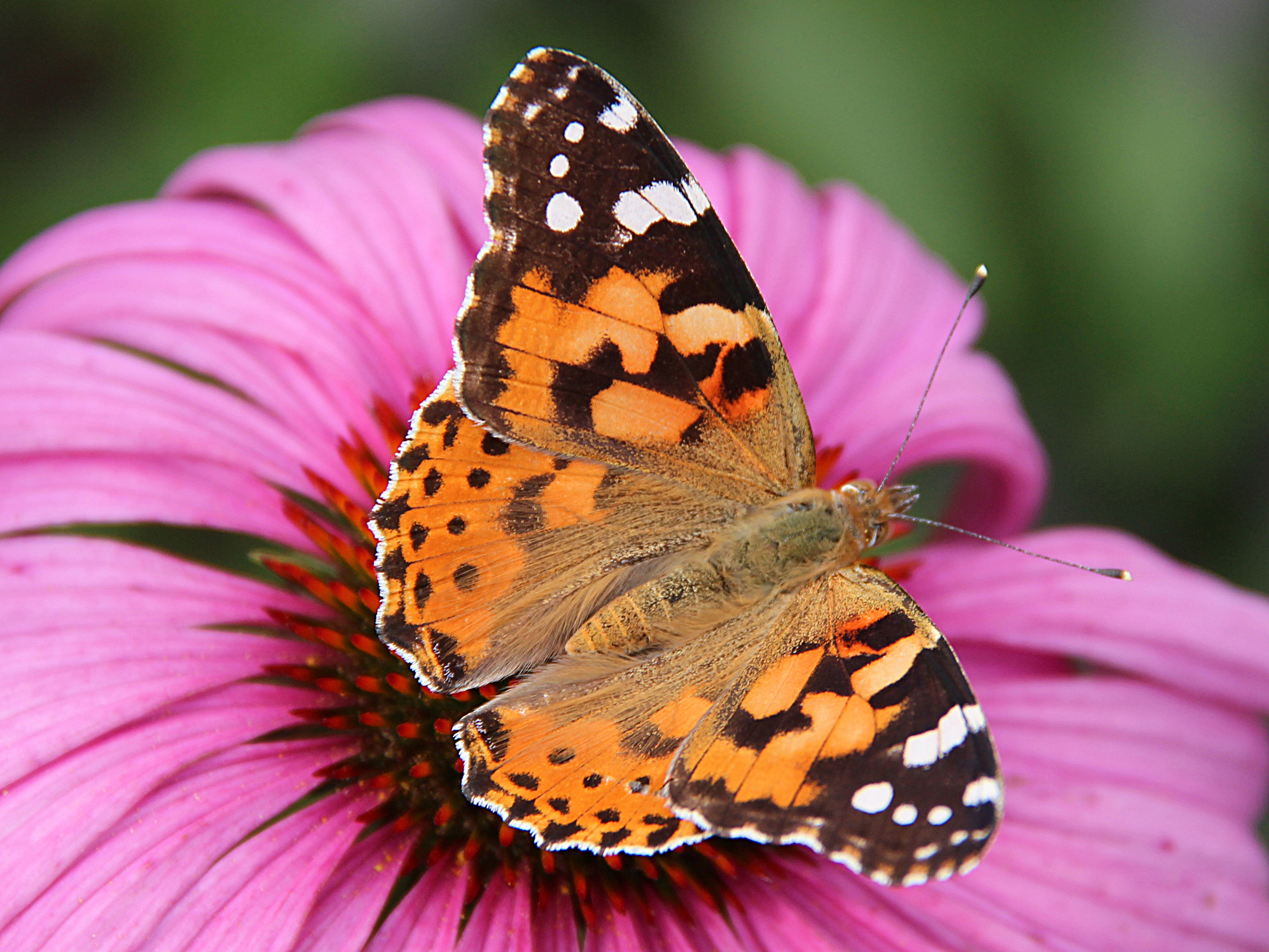
- Upperside
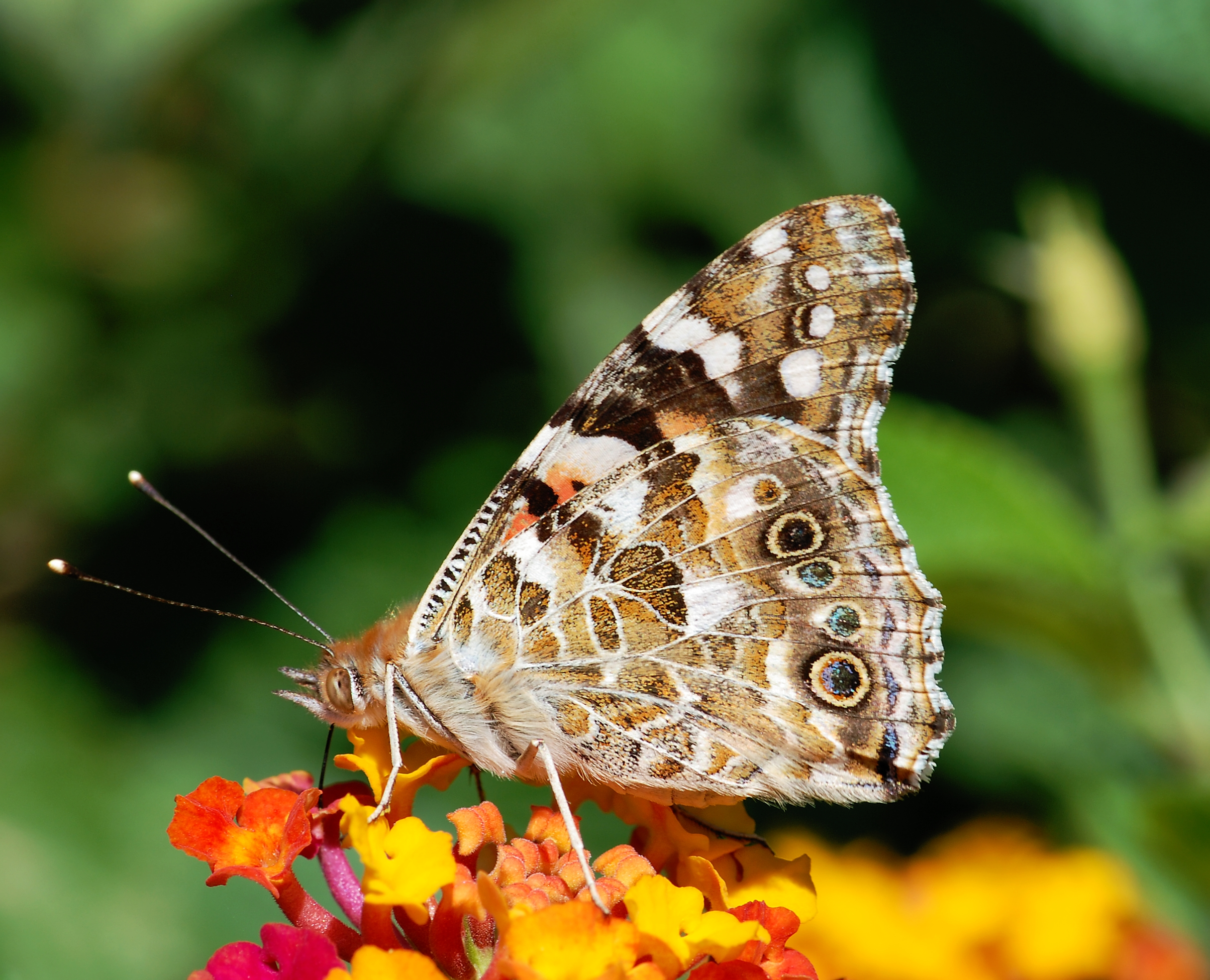
- Underside

Conservation status
- Least Concern (IUCN 3.1)

Scientific classification
- Kingdom: Animalia
- Phylum: Arthropoda
- Clade: Pancrustacea
- Class: Insecta
- Order: Lepidoptera
- Family: Nymphalidae
- Genus: Vanessa
- Species: V. cardui

Binomial name
- Vanessa cardui (Linnaeus, 1758)

Synonyms
- Papilio cardui Linnaeus, 1758

= Vanessa cardui =

Species of butterfly

Vanessa cardui is the most widespread of all butterfly species. It is commonly called the painted lady, or formerly in North America the cosmopolitan butterfly.

== Description ==
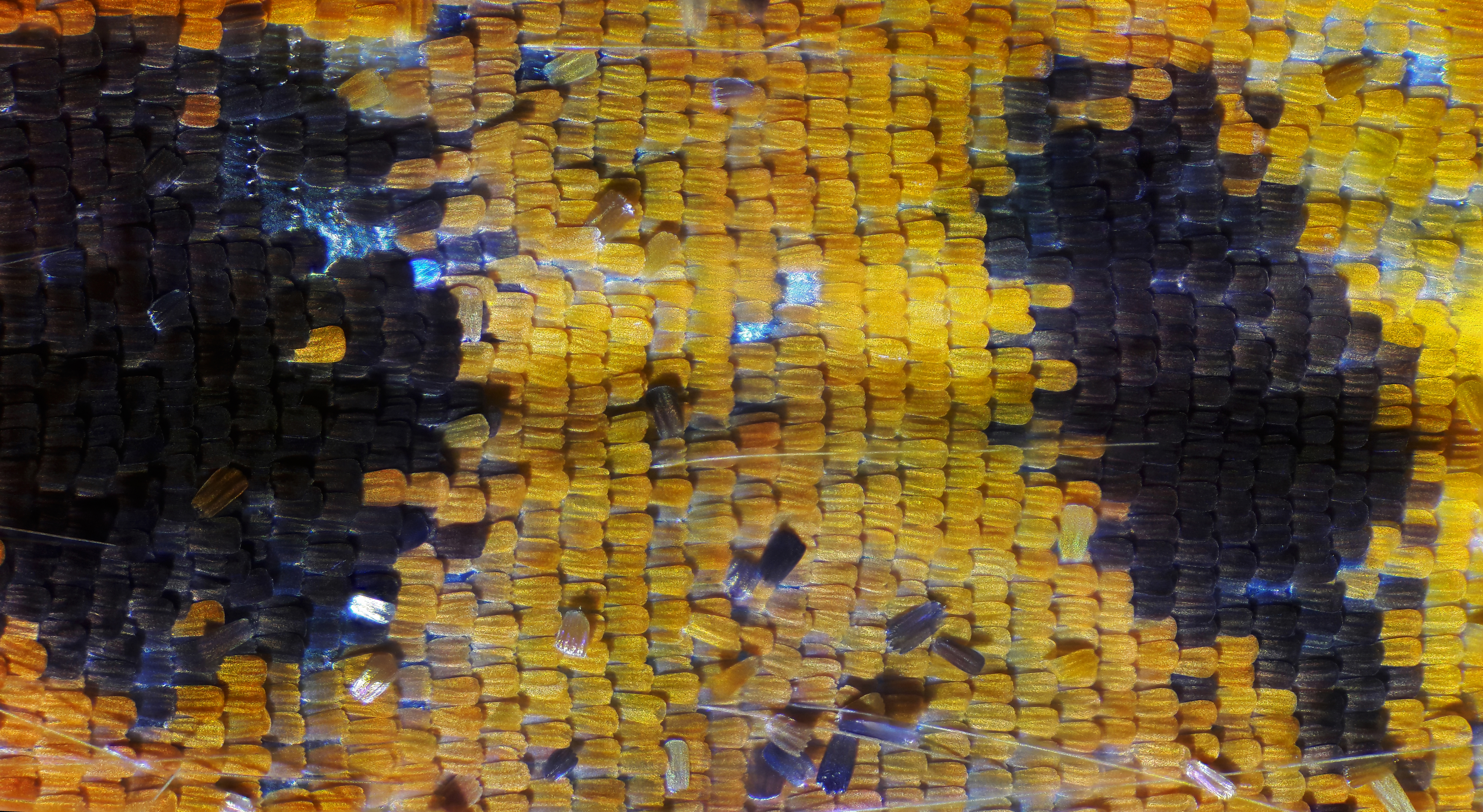
Wing scales.

Male and female. Upperside. Ground-colour reddish-ochreous, basal areas olivescent-ochreous-brown; cilia black, alternated with white, Forewing with an outwardly-oblique black irregular-shaped broken band crossing from middle of the cell to the disc above the submedian vein; the apical area from end of cell and the exterior border also black; before the apex is a short white outwardly-oblique streak and a curved row of four round spots, the second and third being small; a marginal pale lunular line with its upper portion most defined and whitish. Hind-wing with a blackish patch from the costal vein across end of cell, a partly confluent recurved discal band, a submarginal row of lunules, and then a marginal row of somewhat scutiform spots; between the discal band and submarginal lunules is a row of five round black spots, which in some examples show a pale and dark outer ring. Underside. Forewing brighter reddish-ochreous, the apical area and outer margin much paler, the apex being olivescent ochreous-brown; discal irregular band as above, subapical white streak, row of spots and marginal lunules distinct; base of wing and interspace before end of cell white. Hindwing transversely-marbled with olivescent ochreous-brown and speckled with black scales; crossed by basal and discal sinuous whitish or pale fascia and intersected by white veins; an outer-discal row of five ocelli, the upper one smallest and usually imperfect, the second and fifth the largest, the fourth with black centre speckled with blue and ringed with yellow, and the second and fifth also with an outer black ring; submarginal lunules purpurescent-grey, bordered by a whitish fascia; outer margin ochreous. Body olivescent ochreous-brown, abdomen with ochreous bands; palpi blackish above, white beneath; body beneath and legs greyish-white; antennae black above, tip and beneath reddish.

— Frederic Moore, Lepidoptera Indica. Vol. IV

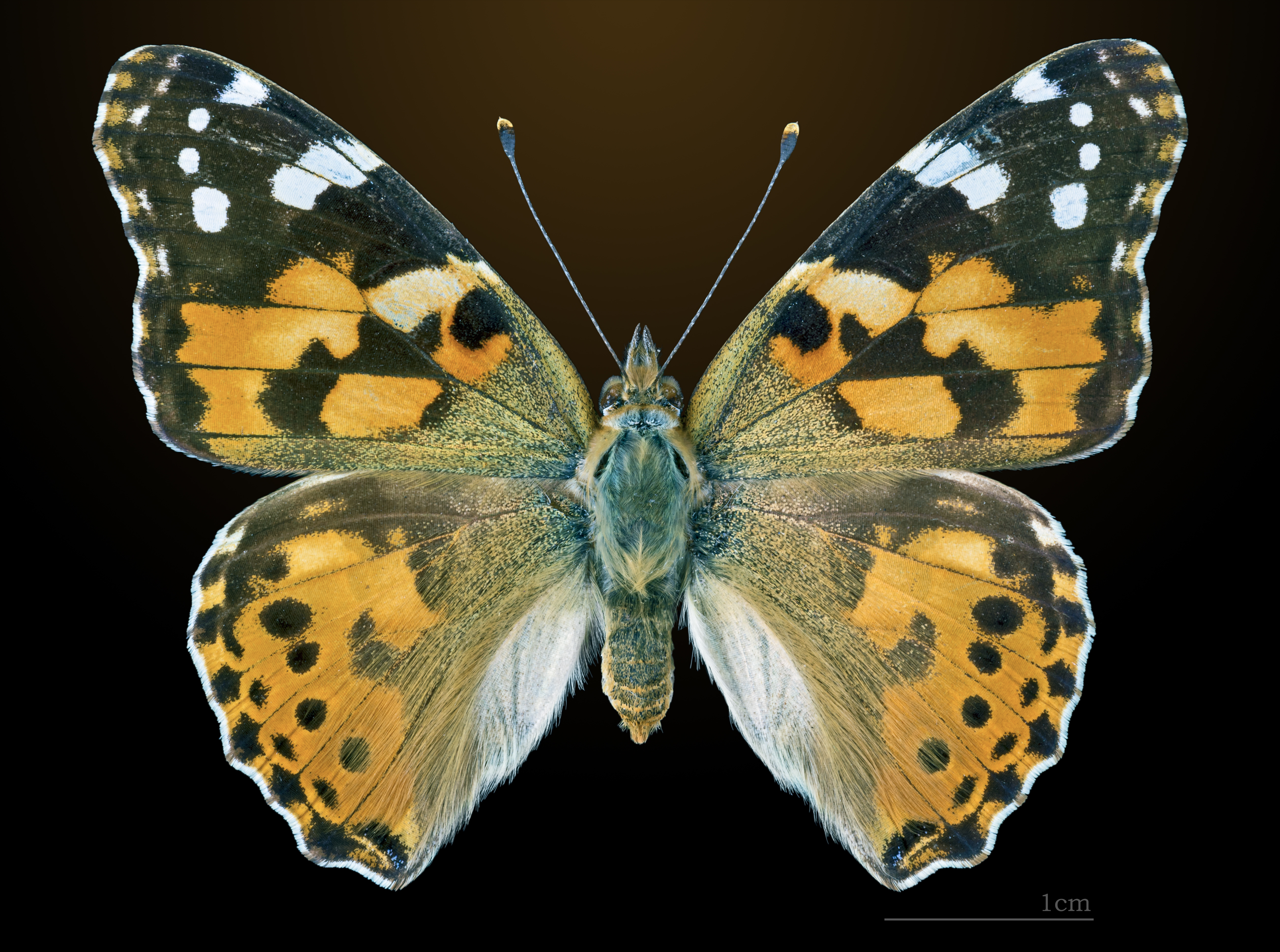
Dorsal side

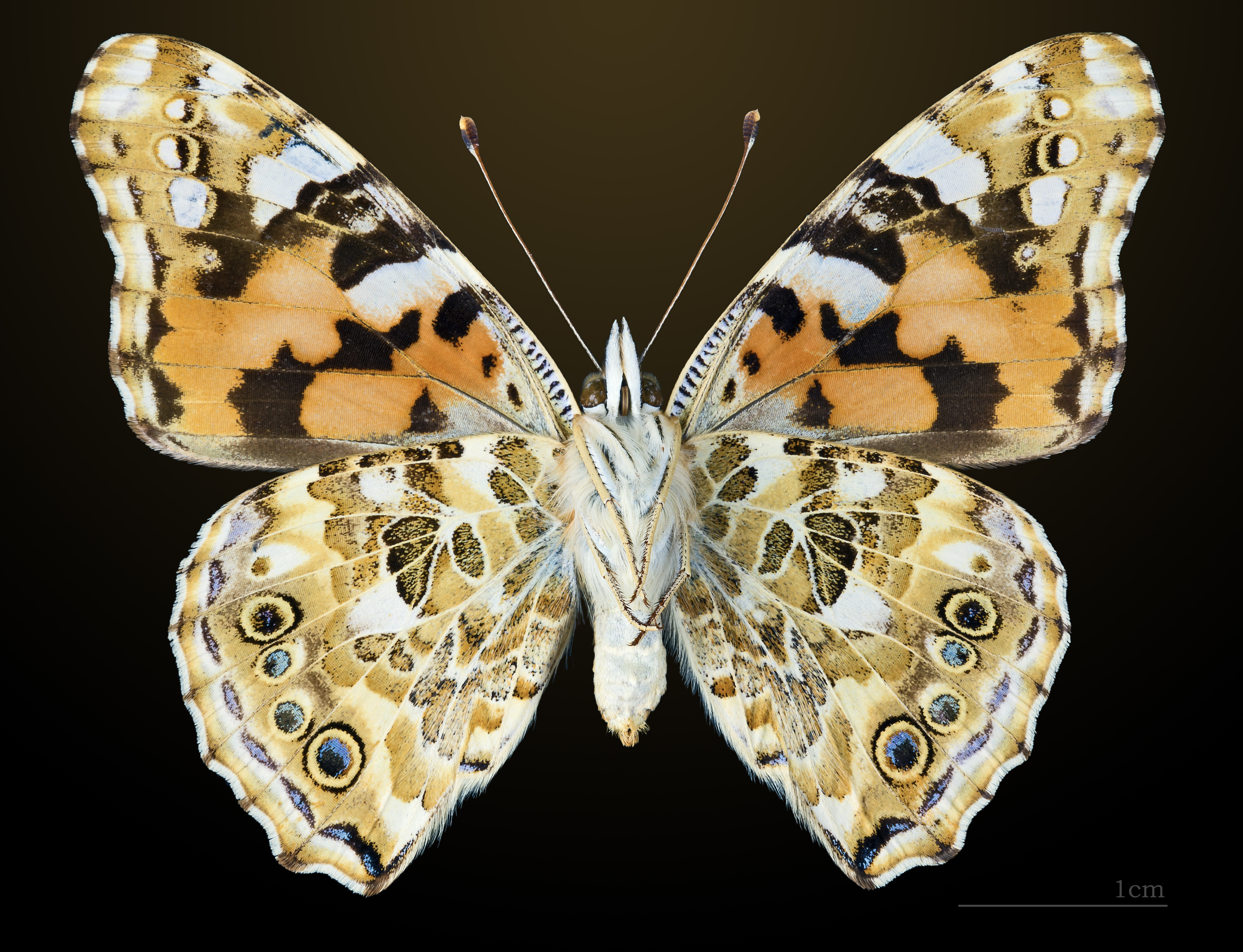
Ventral side

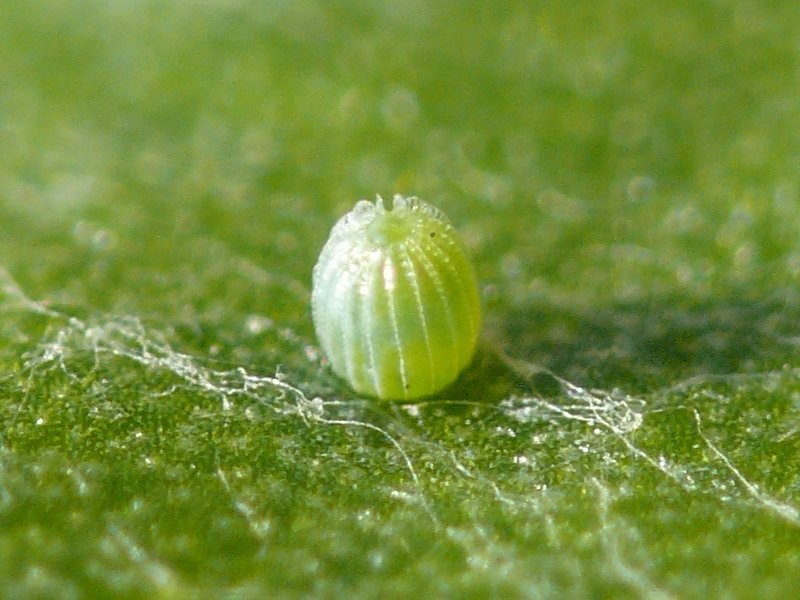
Egg

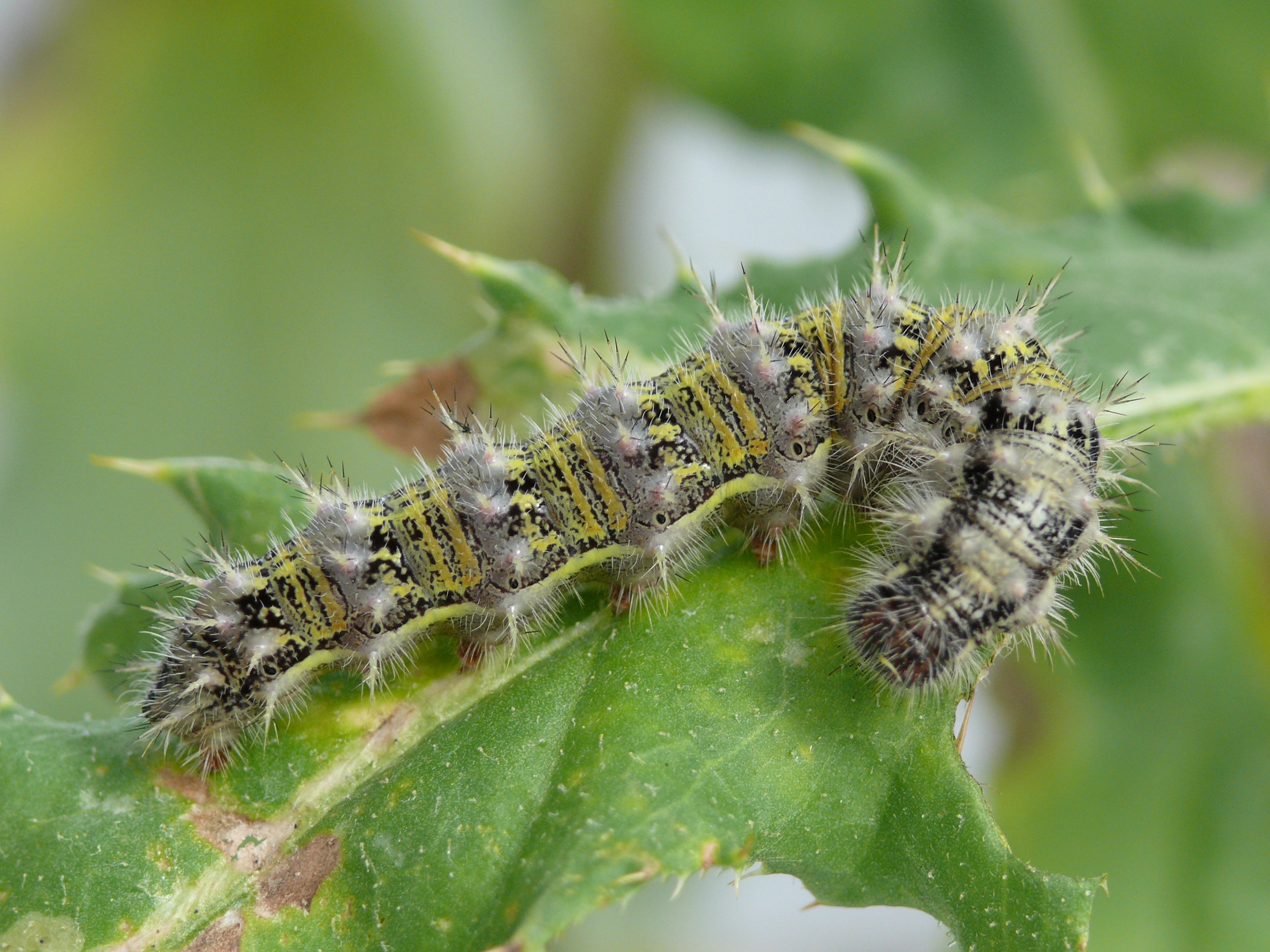
Larva

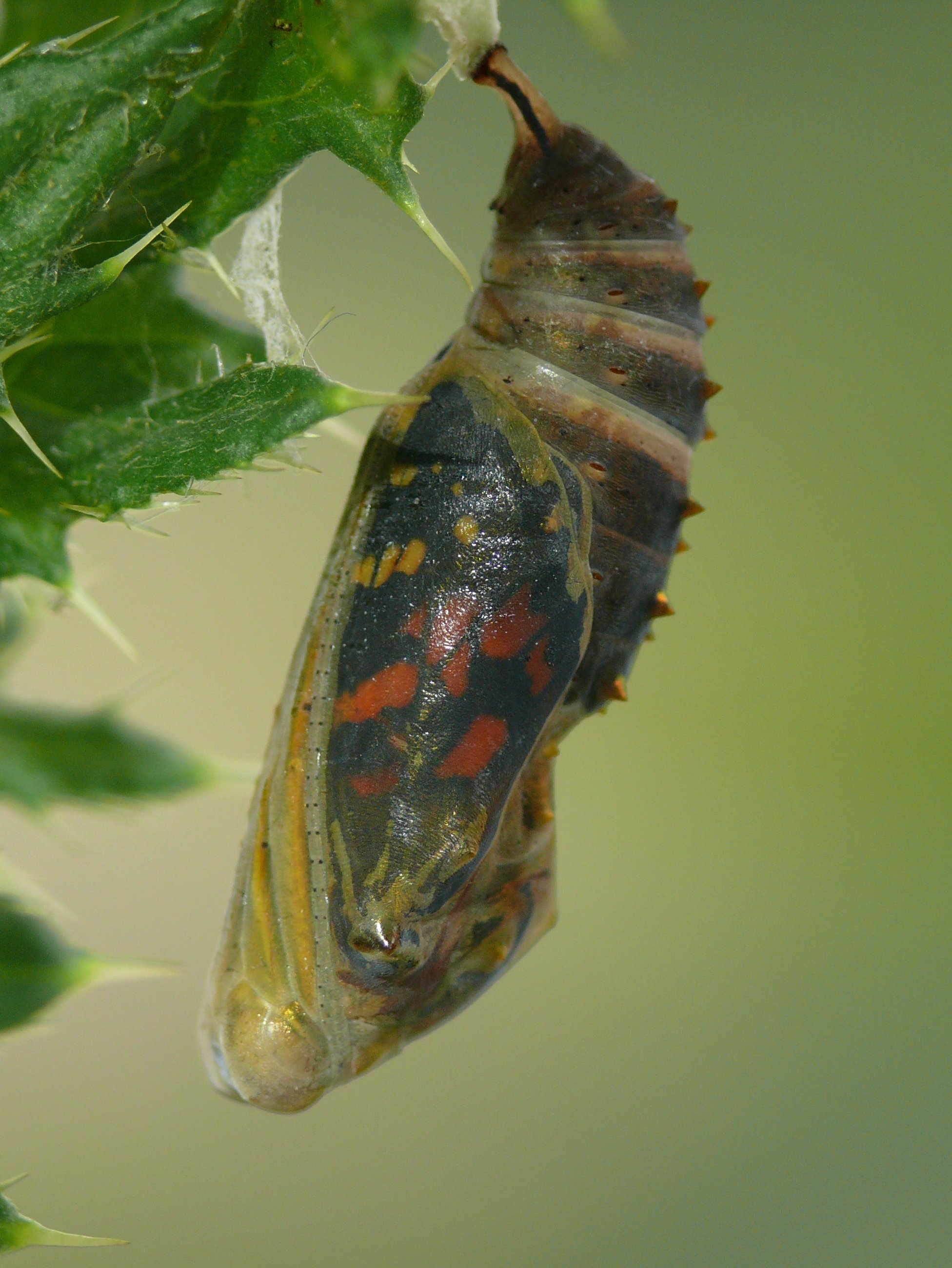
Pupa

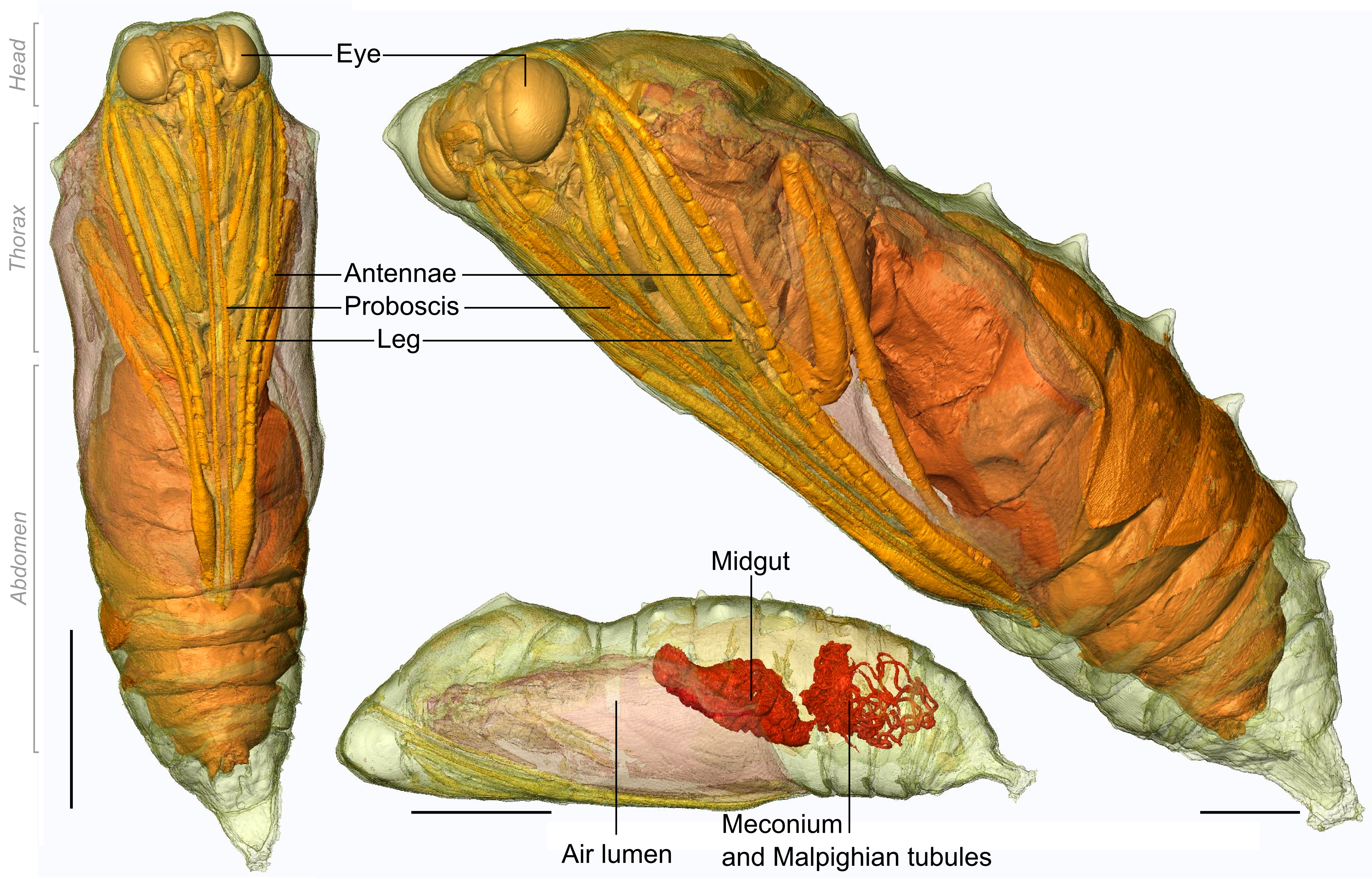
Inside Pupa

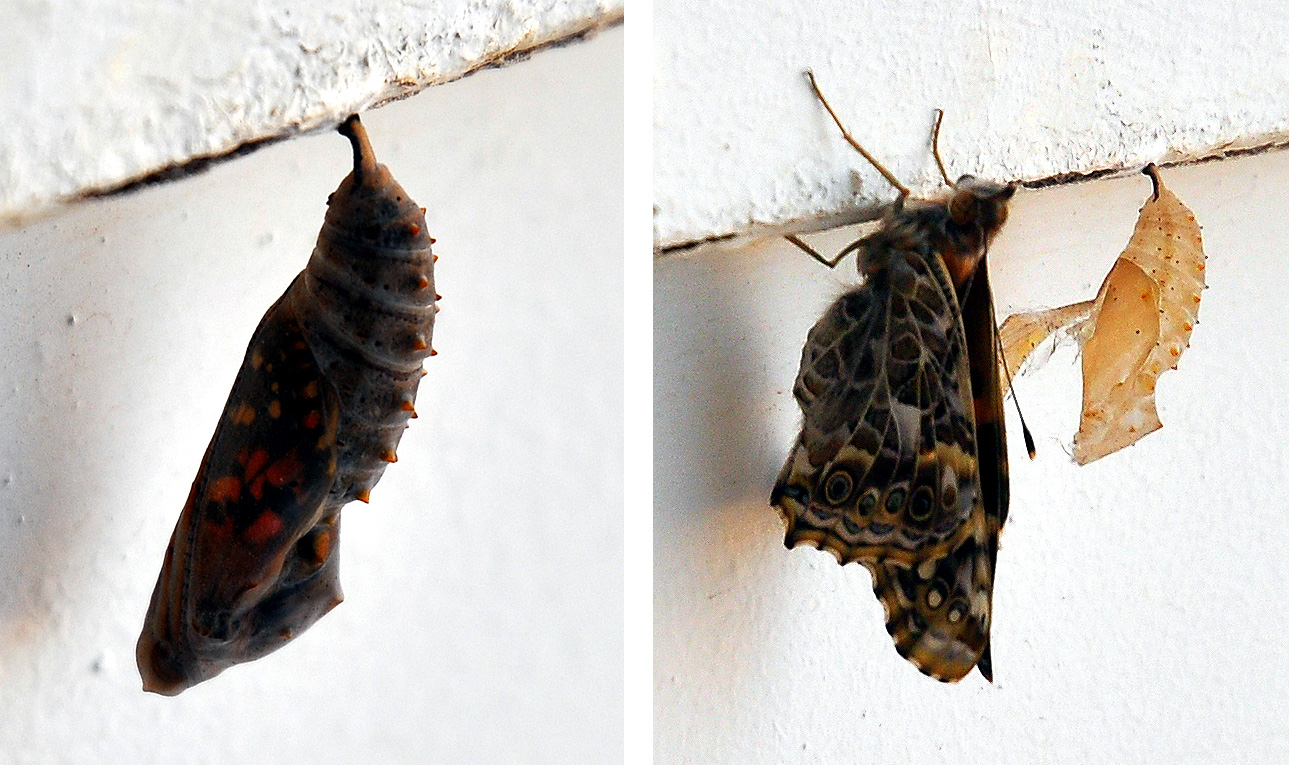
Emergence

== Distribution ==
V. cardui is one of the most widespread of all butterflies, found on every continent except Antarctica. It is rare or vagrant in South America. In Australia V. cardui has a limited range around Bunbury, Fremantle and Rottnest Island. However its close relative, the Australian painted lady (V. kershawi, sometimes considered a subspecies), ranges over half the continent. Other closely related species are the American painted lady (V. virginiensis) and the West Coast lady (V. annabella).

== Ecology and behavior ==
=== Food sources and host plants ===
Larvae feed on Asteraceae species, including Cirsium, Carduus, Centaurea, Arctium, Onopordum, Helianthus and Artemisia.

The painted lady uses more than 300 recorded host plants according to the HOSTS database.

Adult butterflies feed on flower nectar and aphid honeydew.

=== Migration (Europe) ===
Vanessa cardui spring migration between North Africa and Europe.

V. cardui occurs in any temperate zone, including mountains in the tropics. The species is resident only in warmer areas but migrates in spring and sometimes again in autumn. It migrates from North Africa and the Mediterranean to Britain and Europe in May and June, occasionally reaching Iceland, and from the Red Sea basin, via Israel and Cyprus, to Turkey in March and April. The occasional autumn migration by V. cardui is likely made for the inspection of resource changes; it consists of a round trip from Europe to Africa.

For decades naturalists have debated whether the offspring of these immigrants ever make a southwards return migration. Research suggests that British painted ladies do undertake an autumn migration, making 14,500 km (9,000 mi) a return journey from tropical Africa to the Arctic Circle in a series of steps by up to six successive generations. The Radar Entomology Unit at Rothamsted Research provided evidence that autumn migrations take place at high altitude, which explains why these migrations are seldom witnessed. In recent years, thanks to the activity of The Worldwide Painted Lady Migration citizen science project, led by the Barcelona-based Institute of Evolutionary Biology (Catalan: Institut de Biologia Evolutiva), the huge range of migration has begun to be revealed. For example, some butterflies migrated from Iceland to the Sahara desert, and even further south.

V. cardui is known for its distinct migratory behaviour. In California they are usually seen flying from north to north-west. These migrations appear to be partially initiated by heavy winter rains in the desert, where rainfall controls the growth of larval food plants. In March 2019, after heavy rain produced an abundance of vegetation in the deserts, Southern California saw these butterflies migrating by the millions across the state.

Similarly, heavier than usual rain during the 2018-2019 winter seems to have been the cause of the extraordinarily large migration observed in Israel at the end of March, estimated at a billion individual butterflies. Painted lady migration patterns are highly erratic and they do not migrate every year. Some evidence suggests that global climatic events, such as el Niño, may affect the migratory behaviour of the painted lady butterflies, causing large-scale migrations.

The first noticeable wave of migration in eastern Ukraine was noted in the 20s of April 2019. From May 15 numbers began to grow and it was possible to observe hundreds of this species in the Kharkiv region of Ukraine, including in the city streets of Kharkiv.

Based on experimental data, the painted lady's migration pattern in northern Europe apparently does not follow a strict north-west direction. The range of headings suggests that migrating butterflies may adjust their migration patterns in response to local topographical features and weather, such as strong wind patterns. Laboratory-raised autumn-generation painted lady butterflies were able to distinguish a southern orientation for a return migration path. According to the same laboratory-based study, when butterflies were isolated from the sun, they were unable to orient themselves in a specific direction, opposed to those that did have access to the sun. This suggests that V. cardui requires a direct view of the sky, implying the use of a solar compass to orient its migratory direction and maintain a straight flight path.

A 2024 Nature Communications article provided the first evidence that the painted lady, or any insect, had traveled across an ocean. Specimens were captured on a beach in French Guiana, outside the painted lady's natural habitat. Pollen grains from the butterflies' bodies matched species of West African shrubs that flowered at the same time of year. The researchers also analyzed the butterflies' genomes and used isotope tracing to confirm that they were born in Europe or Africa. Finally, the study found that the trade wind conditions from Africa to South America were "exceptionally favorable" at that time, which would have allowed the butterflies to be propelled over 2,600 miles (4,200 km)—one of the longest journeys of an insect ever recorded.

=== Behavior ===
Groups of two to eight painted lady butterflies have been observed to fly in circles around each other for about one to five seconds before separating, symbolizing courtship. Groups of butterflies usually will not fly more than 4.5 m (15 ft) away from the starting point. To establish and defend their territories, adult males perch in the late afternoon in areas where females are most likely to appear. Once the male spots a female of the same species, he begins pursuit of her. If the foreign butterfly is a male, the original male will give chase, flying vertically for a few feet before returning to his perch.

V. cardui establishes territories within areas sheltered by hedgerows. Vanessa cardui tend to inhabit sunny, brightly lit, open environments and are often attracted to open areas of flowers and clovers. Adults spend time in small depressions in the ground on overcast days.

==== Mating ====
V. cardui displays a unique system of continuous mating, throughout all seasons, including the winter. This may be attributed to its migratory patterns, thus significantly affecting its mating behaviour. During European migrations, the butterflies immediately begin to mate and lay eggs upon arrival in the Mediterranean in the spring, starting in late May. In the United States, painted lady butterflies migrating towards the north experience poor mating conditions, and many butterflies have limited breeding capabilities. The "local adult generation" develops during this time, roughly from the middle of May through early June in conjunction with the butterfly progression throughout their flight.

During its migratory process, these painted lady butterflies start breeding, and reproduce entirely throughout their migration. Scientists have not been able to find evidence of their overwintering; this may be because they migrate to warmer locations to survive and reproduce. Female painted lady butterflies may suspend their flight temporarily when they are "ready to oviposit"; this allows them the opportunity to continually reproduce throughout their migrations. Because these butterflies are constantly migrating, male butterflies are thought to lack consistent territory. Instead of requiring territory to mate with females and developing evolutionary behaviour to defend this territory, the mating butterflies appear to establish a particular "time and place" in certain locations that they find to be suitable for reproduction. More specifically, they locate certain perches, hilltops, forest-meadow edges, or other landmarks where they will stay until, presumably, a female arrives to mate.

Equally important for the reproduction of the painted lady butterflies is the males' exhibition of polygynous mating behaviour, in which they often mate with more than one female. This is important for painted lady butterflies because the benefits may supersede the costs of polygyny since no permanent breeding ground is used. Upon mating, which typically occurs in the afternoon, female painted lady butterflies lay eggs one by one in their desired breeding locations. The variety of eclosion locations ultimately dictates the male painted lady behaviour.

Female painted lady butterflies have been observed to have a relatively "high biotic potential", meaning they each produce large numbers of offspring. This perpetual influx of reproduction may be a reason why these painted lady butterflies have propagated so successfully. One interesting aspect that scientists have observed is that these butterflies like to fly towards rain. Further studies have suggested that the large amounts of rainfall may somehow "activate more eggs or induce better larval development".

Inhabited locations begin to observe a large influx of new generations of painted lady butterflies in the fall, particularly in September and October. Their reproductive success declines relatively throughout the winter, primarily through November. However, they still continue to reproduce—an aspect of butterfly behaviour that is quite unique. Scientists hypothesize that these extensive migratory patterns help the painted lady butterflies find suitable conditions for breeding, thus offering a possible reason as to why these butterflies mate continuously.

==== Oviposition ====
Females oviposit on plants with nectar immediately available for the adults even if it leads to high mortality of the larvae. This lack of discrimination indicates they do not take into account volatile chemicals released from potential host plants when searching for oviposition choices.

The availability of adult resources dictates a preference for specific areas of flowers. Flowers with more available nectar result in a larger number of eggs deposited on the plants. This reinforces the idea that the painted lady butterfly does not discriminate host plants and chooses mainly on the availability of adult food sources even if it increases the mortality rate of the offspring. The data also suggest that the painted lady butterfly favors quantity of offspring over quality.

==== Defence mechanisms ====
The main defence mechanisms of painted lady butterflies include flight and camouflage. The caterpillars hide in small silk nests on top of leaves from their main predators that include wasps, spiders, ants, and birds.

=== Vision ===
Painted lady butterflies have a visual system that resembles that of a honey bee. Adult V. cardui eyes contain ultraviolet, blue, and green opsins. Unlike other butterflies, such as the monarch or red postman butterflies, painted ladies lack red receptors, which means that they are not sensitive to red light. Behavioral studies on the related species, Vanessa atalanta, have demonstrated that V. atalanta cannot distinguish yellow light from orange light or orange light from red light.

== Human interaction ==
Vanessa cardui and other painted lady species are bred in schools for educational purposes and used for butterfly releases at hospices, memorial events, and weddings.
