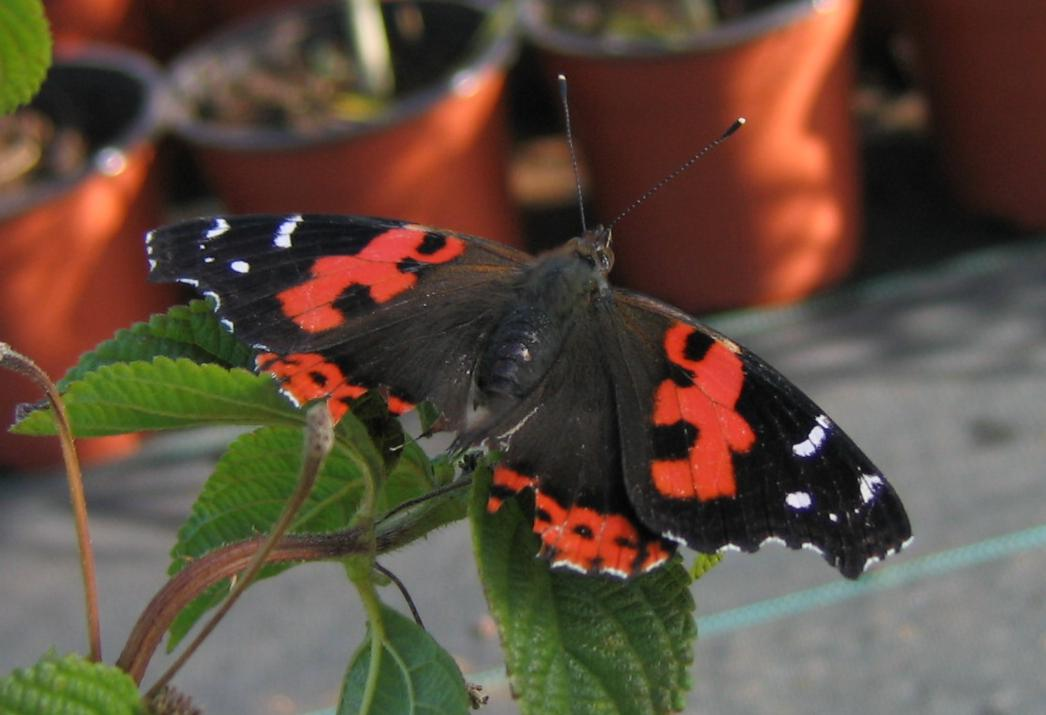

Conservation status
- Least Concern (IUCN 3.1)

Scientific classification
- Kingdom: Animalia
- Phylum: Arthropoda
- Class: Insecta
- Order: Lepidoptera
- Family: Nymphalidae
- Genus: Vanessa
- Species: V. vulcania

Binomial name
- Vanessa vulcania Godart, 1819

= Vanessa vulcania =

Canary red admiral

Species of butterfly

Vanessa vulcania, the Canary red admiral, is a butterfly of the family Nymphalidae. It is found on the Canary Islands (except Lanzarote) and Madeira. Previously, it was considered a subspecies of Vanessa indica, but has been raised to species level after research by Leestmans in 1992.

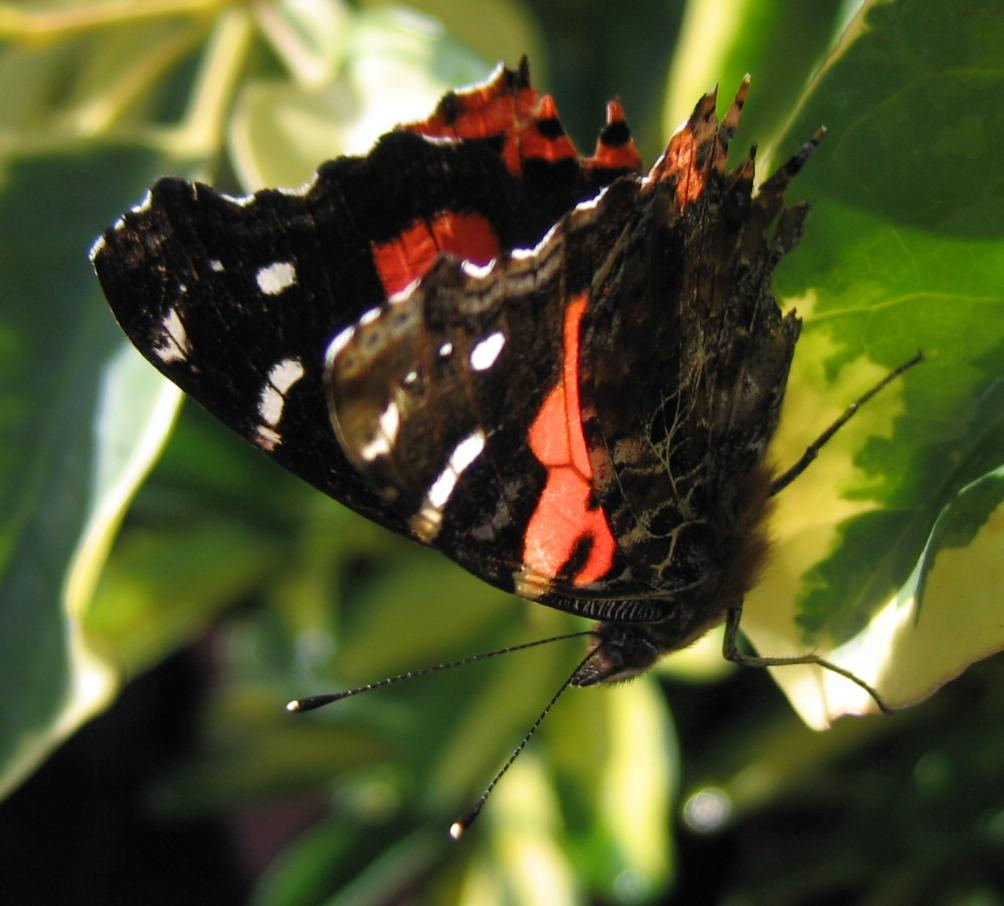

The wingspan is 54–60 mm. It is darker coloured [than Vanessa indica], with the band of the forewing lighter red and strongly sinuate, and particularly large spots in the narrow marginal band of the hindwing, the apex of the forewing, moreover, being more angulate than in atalanta. Vanessa occidentalis Fldr. is a smaller and darker form from Madeira, of which single specimens are also recorded from Portugal

The larvae feed on Urtica morifolia and Urtica urens.
