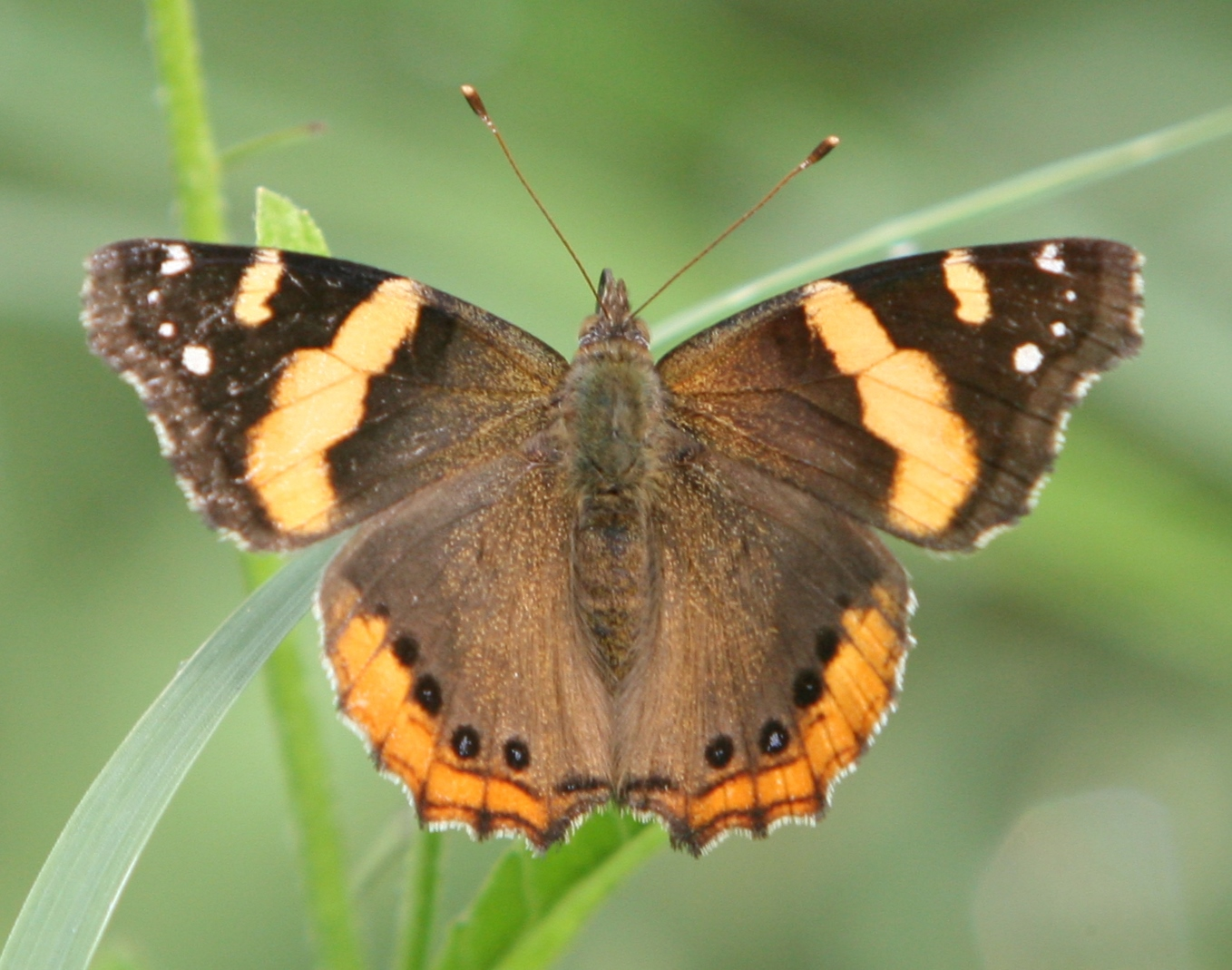

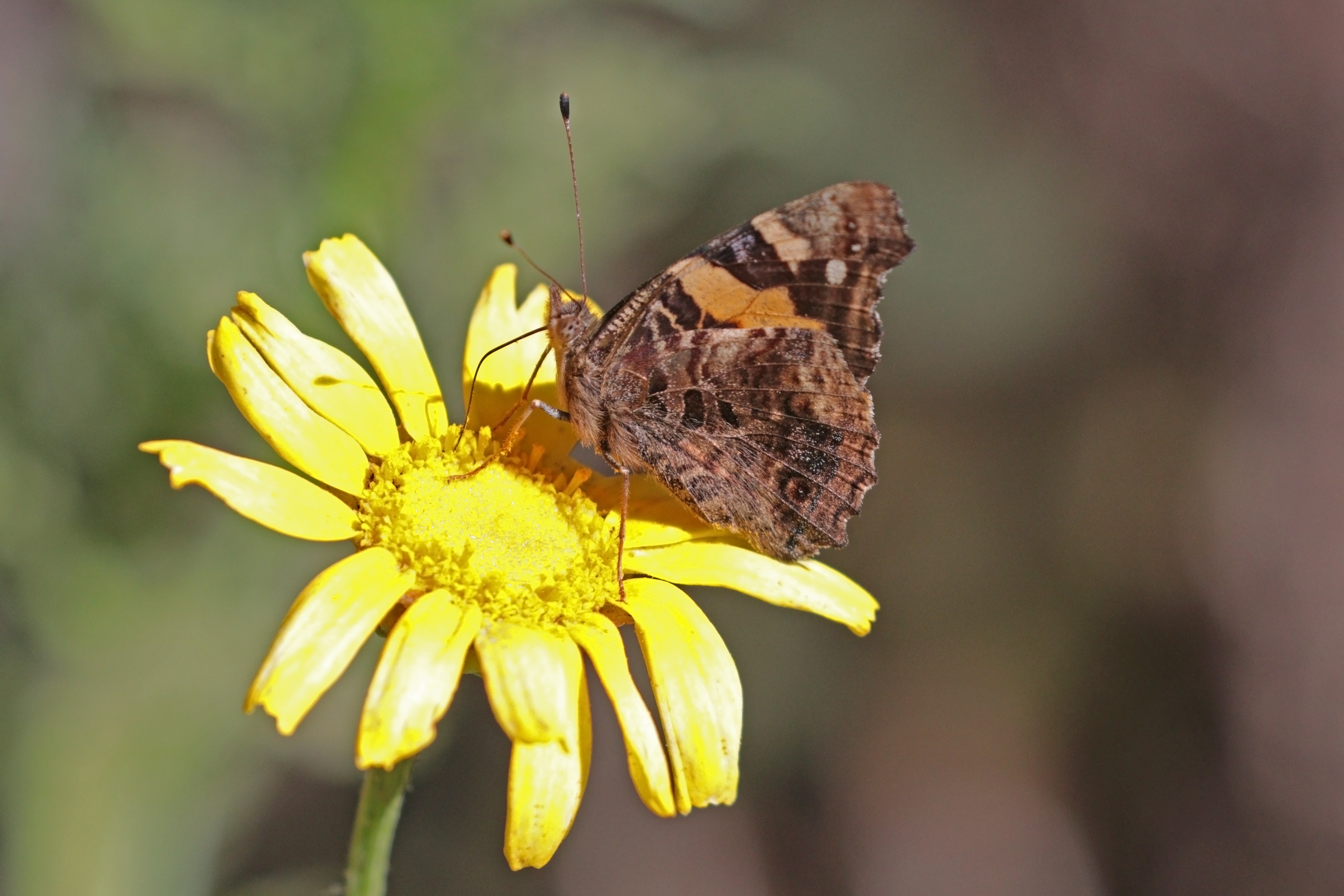
- V. abyssinica jacksoni in Tanzania and V. abyssinica abyssinica in Ethiopia

Scientific classification
- Kingdom: Animalia
- Phylum: Arthropoda
- Clade: Pancrustacea
- Class: Insecta
- Order: Lepidoptera
- Family: Nymphalidae
- Genus: Vanessa
- Species: V. abyssinica

Binomial name
- Vanessa abyssinica (Felder & Felder, 1867)

Synonyms
- Pyrameis abyssinica Felder and Felder, 1867; Antanartia abyssinica; Antanartia abyssinica jacksoni Howarth, 1966; Antanartia abyssinica vansomereni Howarth, 1966

= Vanessa abyssinica =

Abyssinian admiral

Species of butterfly

Vanessa abyssinica, the Abyssinian admiral, is a butterfly in the family Nymphalidae. It is found in Ethiopia, Kenya, Tanzania, Uganda, Rwanda and the Democratic Republic of the Congo. The habitat consists of montane forests.

The larvae feed on Urtica massaica and Obetia pinnatifida.

This species was traditionally considered to be a member of the genus Antanartia but was recently found to be a member of the V. atalanta species group.

== Subspecies ==
- Vanessa abyssinica abyssinica — Ethiopia
- Vanessa abyssinica jacksoni Howarth, 1966 — highlands of Kenya, northern Tanzania
- Vanessa abyssinica vansomereni Howarth, 1966 — western Uganda, Rwanda, Democratic Republic of the Congo: east to Kivu and Ituri
