= Vanessa braziliensis =

- Both in Uruguay

Scientific classification
- Kingdom: Animalia
- Phylum: Arthropoda
- Clade: Pancrustacea
- Class: Insecta
- Order: Lepidoptera
- Family: Nymphalidae
- Genus: Vanessa
- Species: V. braziliensis

Binomial name
- Vanessa braziliensis (Moore, 1883)

Synonyms
- Pyrameis braziliensis Moore, 1883; Pyrameis virginiensis var. rubia Staudinger, 1894; Pyrameis huntera ab. dallasi Köhler, 1945

Species of butterfly

Vanessa braziliensis, the Brazilian painted lady, is a butterfly of the family Nymphalidae found in Brazil, Ecuador, Peru, Bolivia, Venezuela, Paraguay, Uruguay and northern Argentina.
