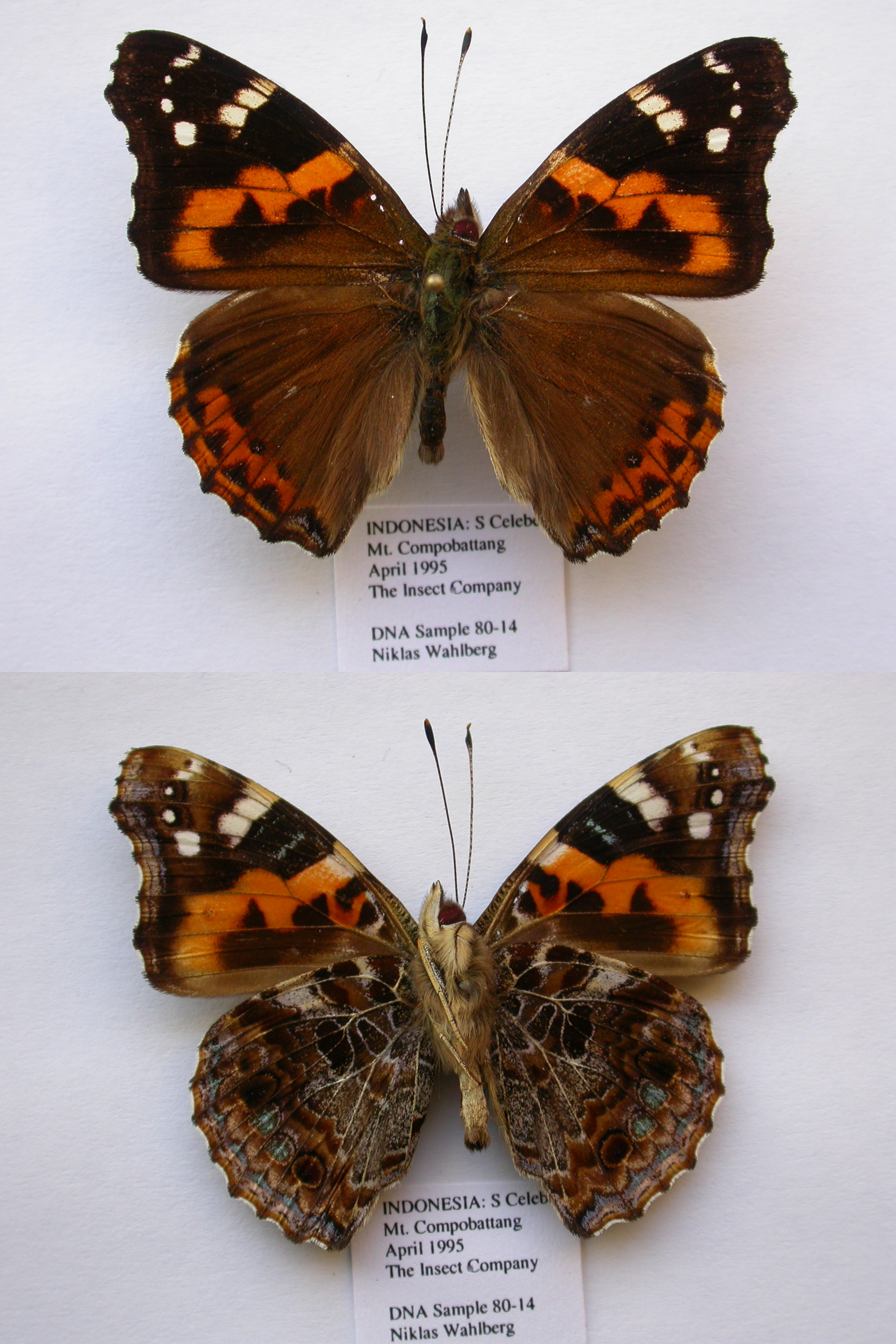

Scientific classification
- Domain: Eukaryota
- Kingdom: Animalia
- Phylum: Arthropoda
- Class: Insecta
- Order: Lepidoptera
- Family: Nymphalidae
- Genus: Vanessa
- Species: V. buana

Binomial name
- Vanessa buana (Fruhstorfer, 1898)

Synonyms
- Pyrameis indica buana Fruhstorfer, 1898

= Vanessa buana =

Lompobatang lady

Species of insect

Vanessa buana, the Lompobatang lady, is a butterfly of the family Nymphalidae found on Sulawesi in Indonesia.
