= William Frederick Henry Rosenberg =

English ornithologist and entomologist (1868-1957)

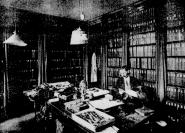
William Rosenberg in his bird room

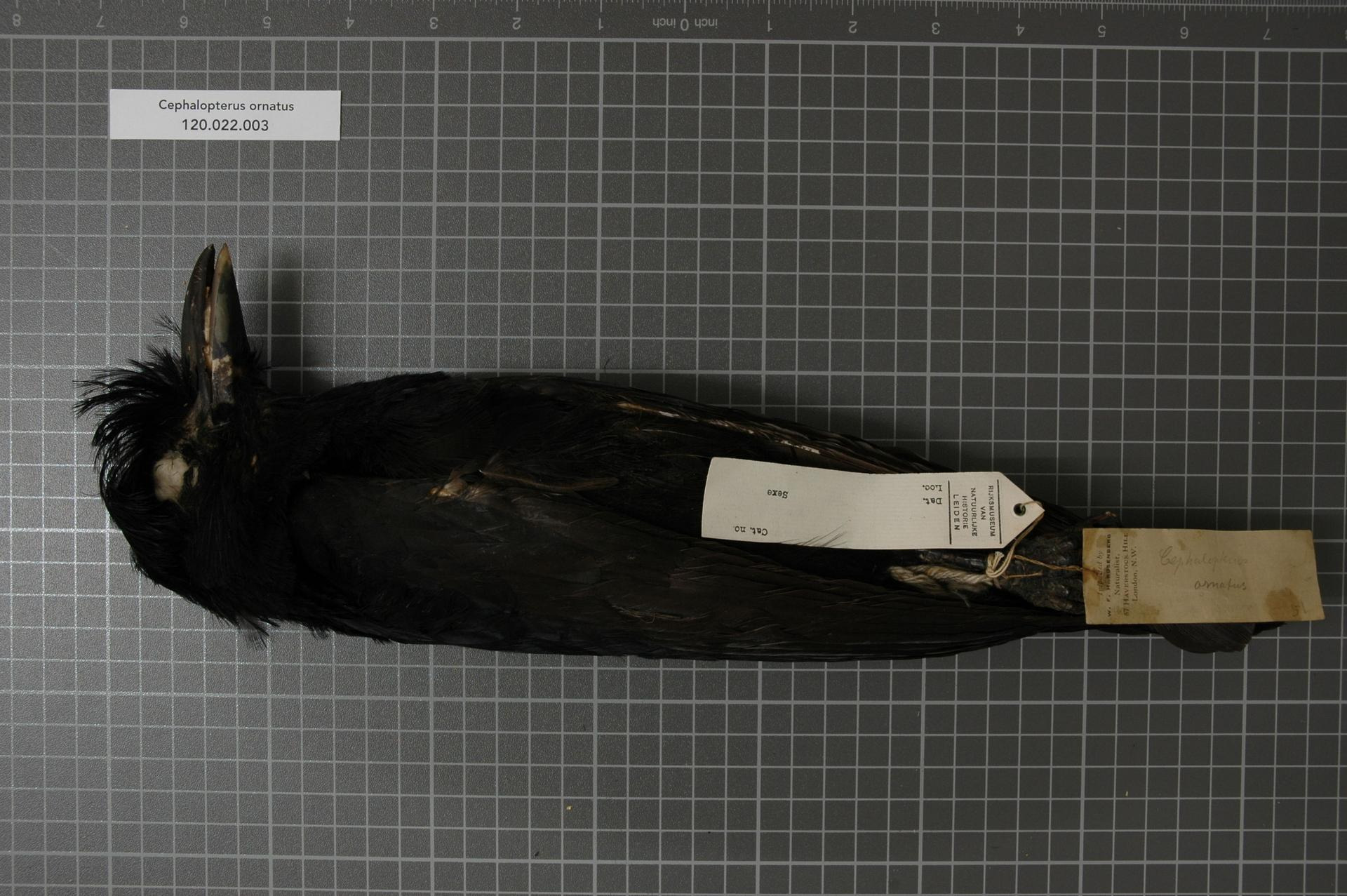
Specimen imported by Rosenberg. Source: Naturalis Biodiversity Center/Wikimedia Commons

William Frederick Henry Rosenberg (1868–1957) was an English ornithologist and entomologist.

His first expedition was to Colombia in 1894 where he collected insects and birds. The bird collection was acquired by Adolphe Boucard. In 1896 he went to Ecuador and later returned to Colombia collecting especially for Walter Rothschild. From 1898 until 1899 he employed collectors in South America who provided him with bird skins for Rothschild. Duplicates went to the British Museum, surplus specimens were sold to other collectors and museums . He started a business as a natural history dealer in Tring in 1897 and in 1898 he moved the dealership to 57 Haverstock Hill, London. He sold specimens from Africa as well as S. America. New species were described by Ernst Hartert.

Rosenberg was a Fellow of the Royal Entomological Society of London.
