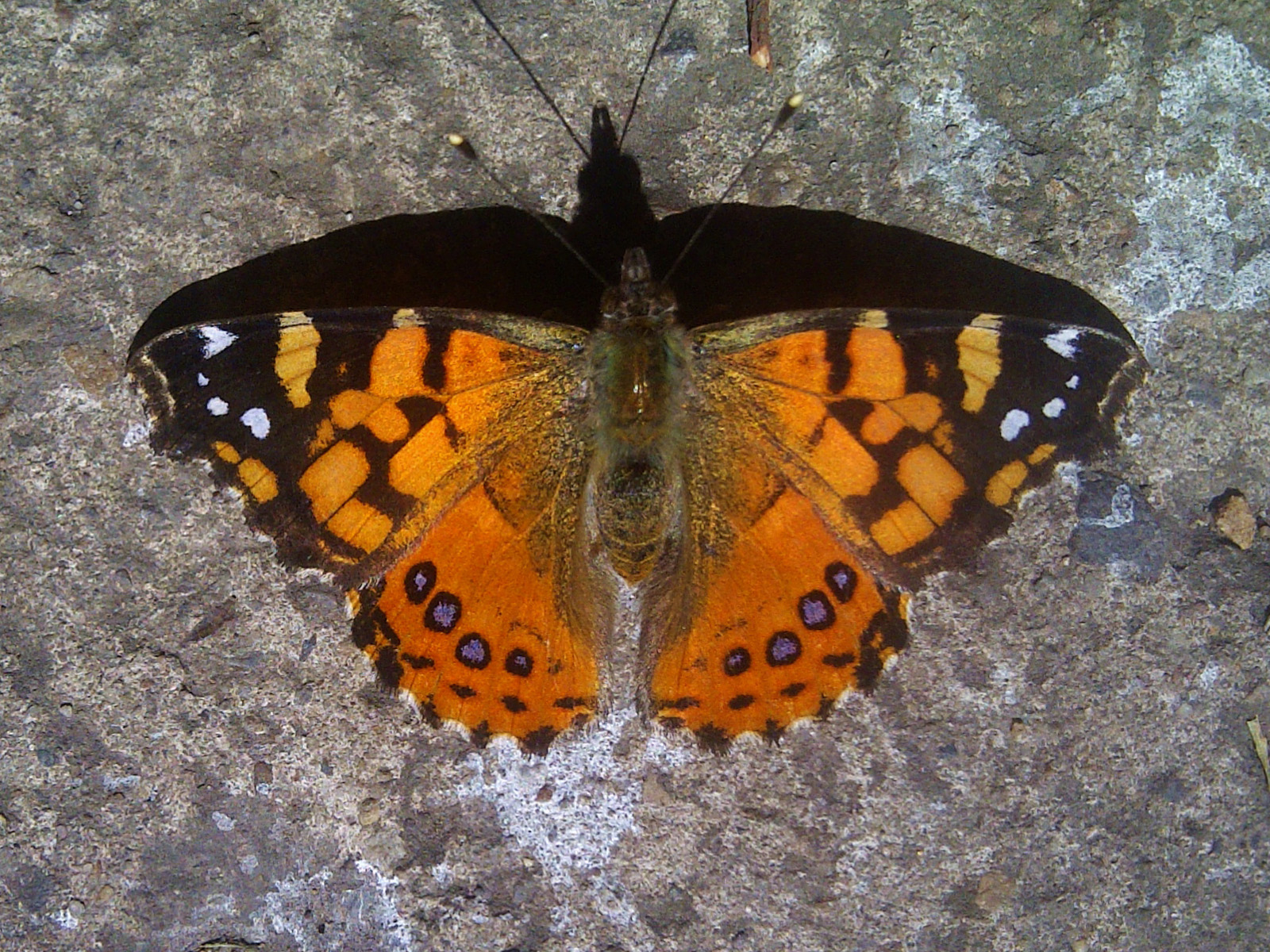

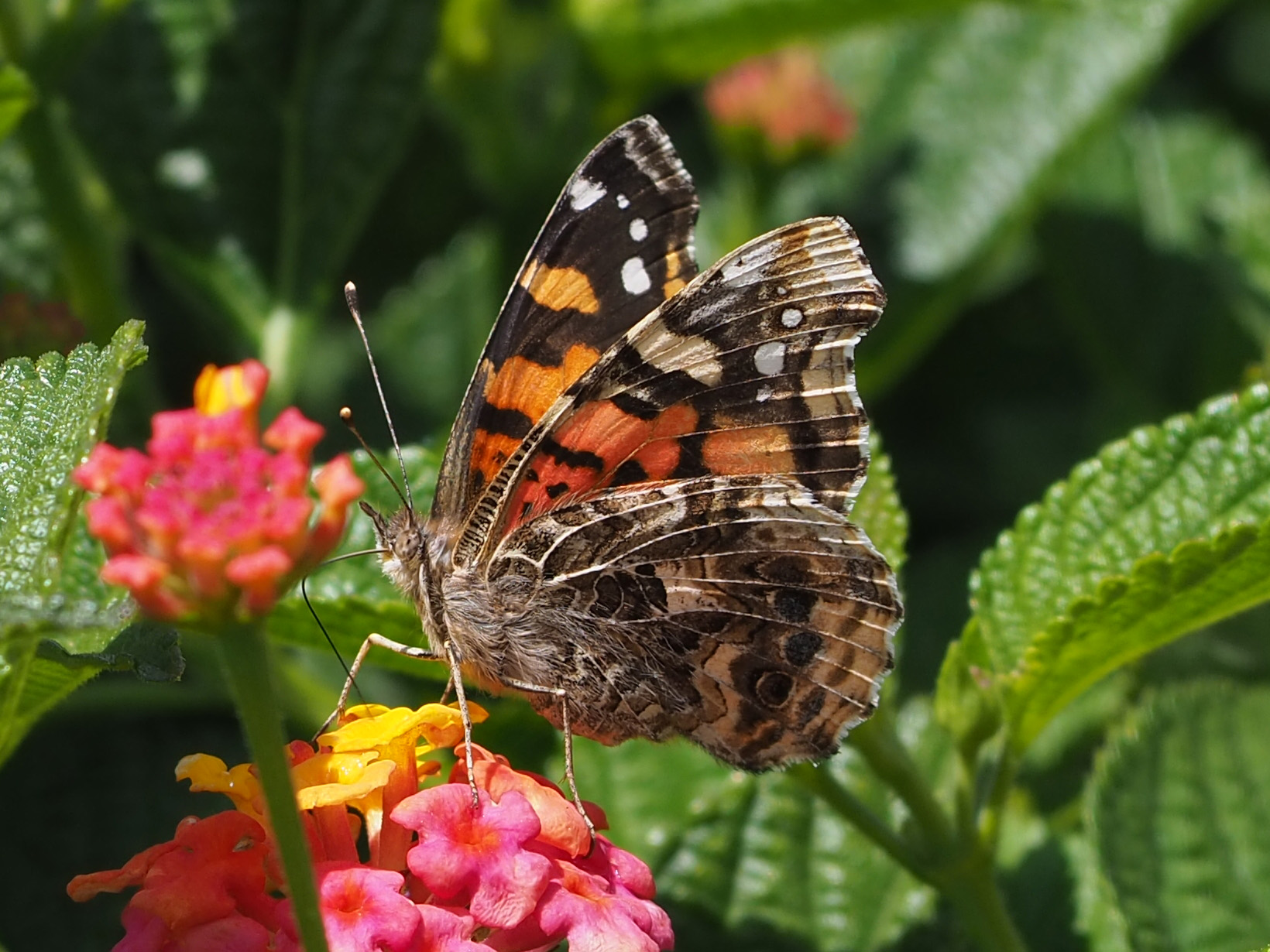

Scientific classification
- Domain: Eukaryota
- Kingdom: Animalia
- Phylum: Arthropoda
- Class: Insecta
- Order: Lepidoptera
- Family: Nymphalidae
- Genus: Vanessa
- Species: V. carye

Binomial name
- Vanessa carye (Hübner [1812])

Synonyms
- Hamadryas carye Hübner, [1812]; Pyrameis caryoides Giacomelli, 1922; Pyrameis carye f. minuscula Hayward, 1931; Pyrameis caryae ab. bruchi Köhler, 1945

= Vanessa carye =

Western painted lady

Species of butterfly

Vanessa carye, the western painted lady, is a butterfly of the family Nymphalidae. It is found in South America, from the mountains of Colombia and west of Caracas (Venezuela) through Ecuador, Peru, Bolivia, Chile, southern Brazil, and Paraguay to Patagonia in Argentina. It is also found on Easter Island and Tuamotus.

The larvae feed on Achyrocline flaccida and many other species.

== See also ==
- Cynthia (butterfly)
- Vanessa annabella
