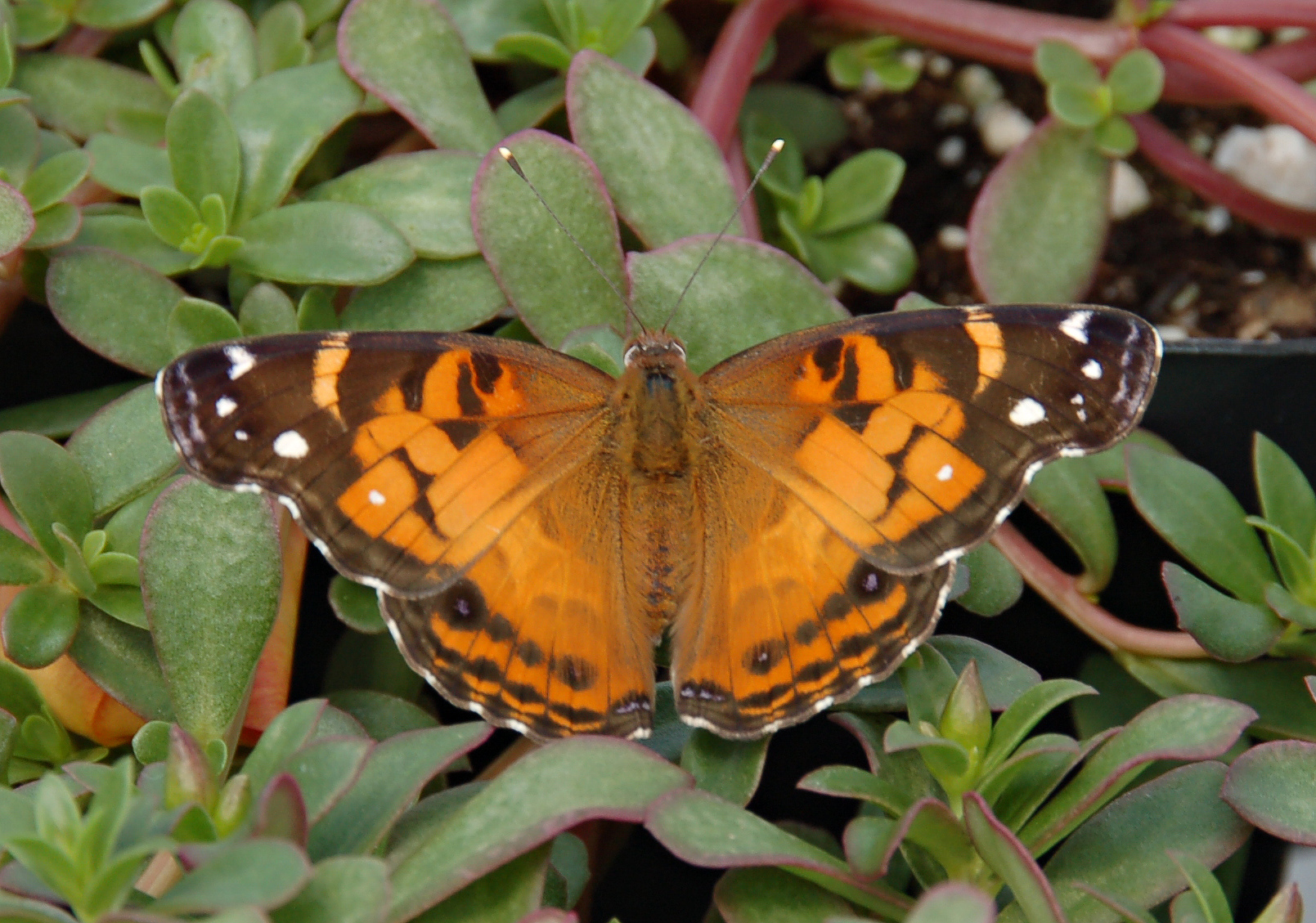

Conservation status
- Least Concern (IUCN 3.1)

- Secure (NatureServe)

Scientific classification
- Kingdom: Animalia
- Phylum: Arthropoda
- Class: Insecta
- Order: Lepidoptera
- Family: Nymphalidae
- Genus: Vanessa
- Species: V. virginiensis

Binomial name
- Vanessa virginiensis (Drury, 1773)

Synonyms
- Nymphalis cardui virginiensis Drury, 1773; Papilio huntera Fabricius, 1775

= American lady =

American painted lady

Species of butterfly

The American painted lady or American lady (Vanessa virginiensis) is a butterfly found throughout North America.

The larvae feed on various Asteraceae, such as the cudweeds (genus Gnaphalium), the pussytoes (Antennaria), and the everlastings (Anaphalis), which all belong to tribe Gnaphalieae. All stages of the life cycle can be found throughout temperate North America as well as Madeira and the Canary Islands. Occasionally individuals can be found as far as southwest Europe. It has been introduced to Hawaii where it is one of four Vanessa species.

== Description ==
Vanessa virginiensis is most easily distinguishable by its two large eyespots on the ventral side, whereas V. cardui has four small eyespots and V. annabella has none. V. virginiensis also uniquely features a white dot within the forewing subapical field, set in pink on the underside and usually also in the dorsal side's orange field.

The largest spot in the black forewing tips is white in V. cardui, pale orange in this species, and orange in the West Coast species. The latter also has a purer orange background color of the dorsal side, as opposed to the darker and (especially in V. virginiensis) redder hue of the other two.

A less reliable indicator is the row of black eyespots on the dorsal submarginal hindwing. In the American painted lady, those on the opposite ends of the row are often larger and have blue "pupils". In V. annabella, this applies to the inner two spots, while in V. cardui some of the black eyespots may have tiny blue pupils in the summer morph, but usually have none at all, and the eyespots themselves are all roughly the same size. The size of the wings are about 5 cm (2 in) across.

== Etymology and taxonomic history ==
The name "painted lady" was in use among James Petiver, Adam Buddle and other naturalists in England for the closely related Vanessa cardui. Petiver had described it as "Papilio Bella donna dicta". Fabricius called the American form of the butterfly as Papilio huntera based on a vagrant specimen captures in Britain and it was for sometime known as Hunter's butterfly. W. J. Holland identified the "Hunter" as an American Indian named John Dunn who had been noted for his hunting ability as the "hunter". John Dunn had later moved to Europe but this hypothesis has been pointed out as being implausible since John Dunn "Hunter" was born c. 1798 and that Fabricius most likely named it after his friend and collecting companion William Hunter.

== Distinguishing features ==
See Cynthia (butterfly) § Distinguishing features

== Gallery ==
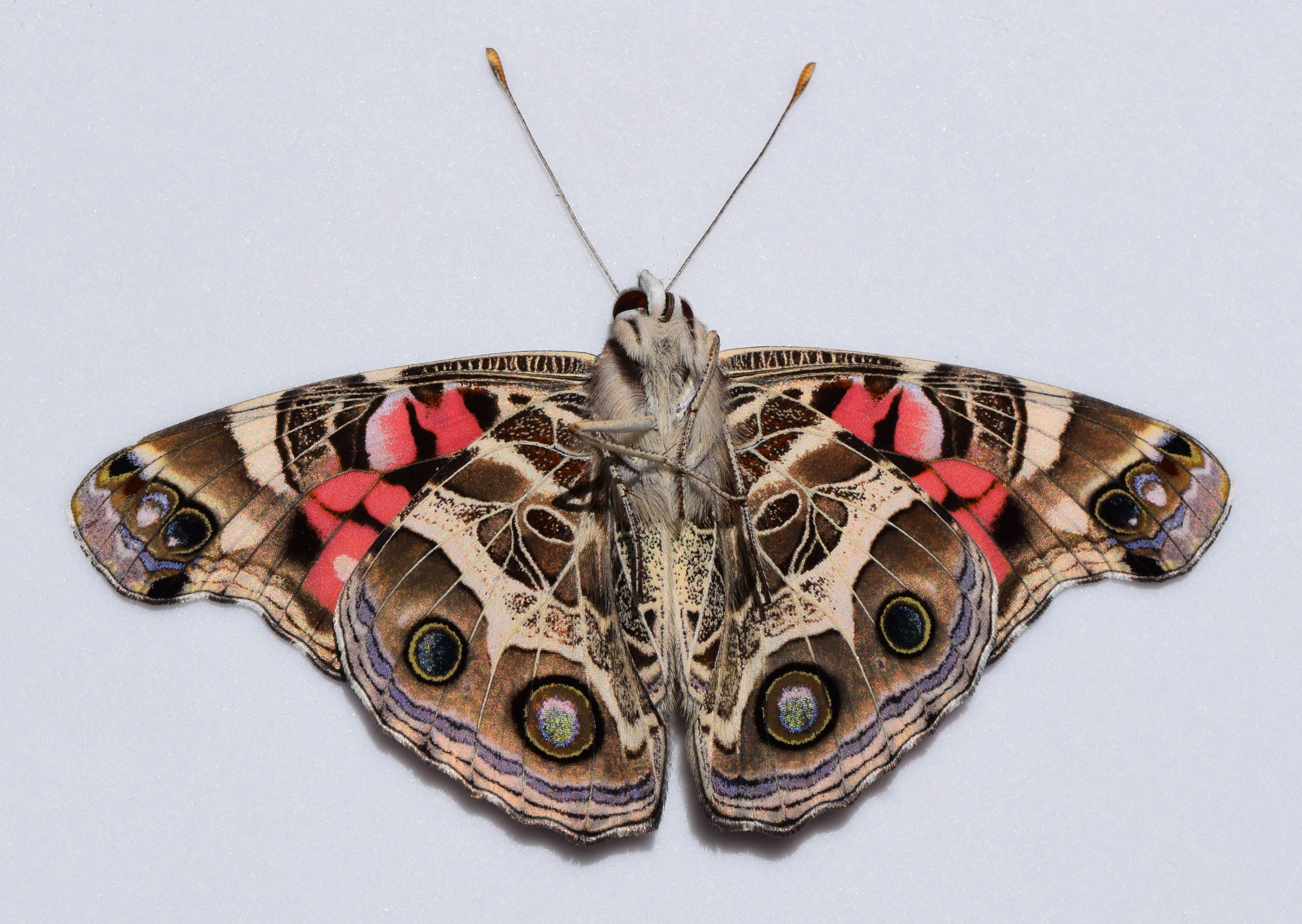
Underside of wings

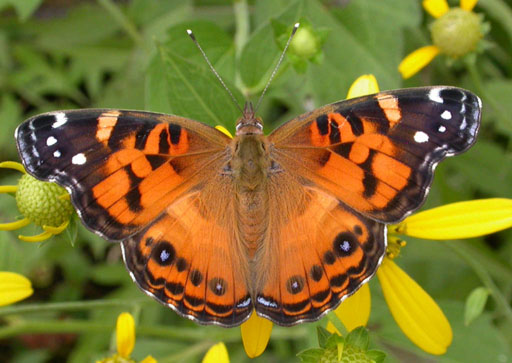
Some individuals lack the additional white subapical forewing spot

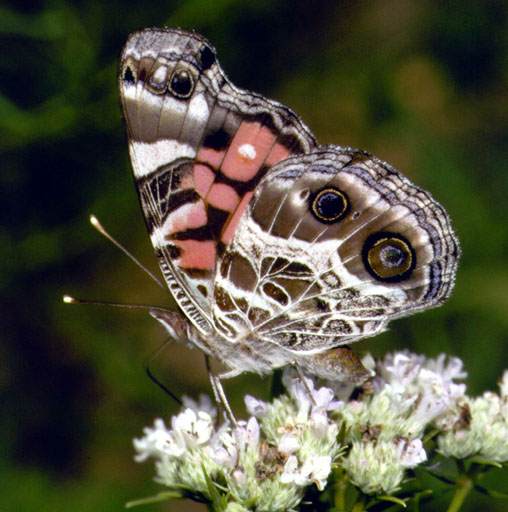
Ventral side

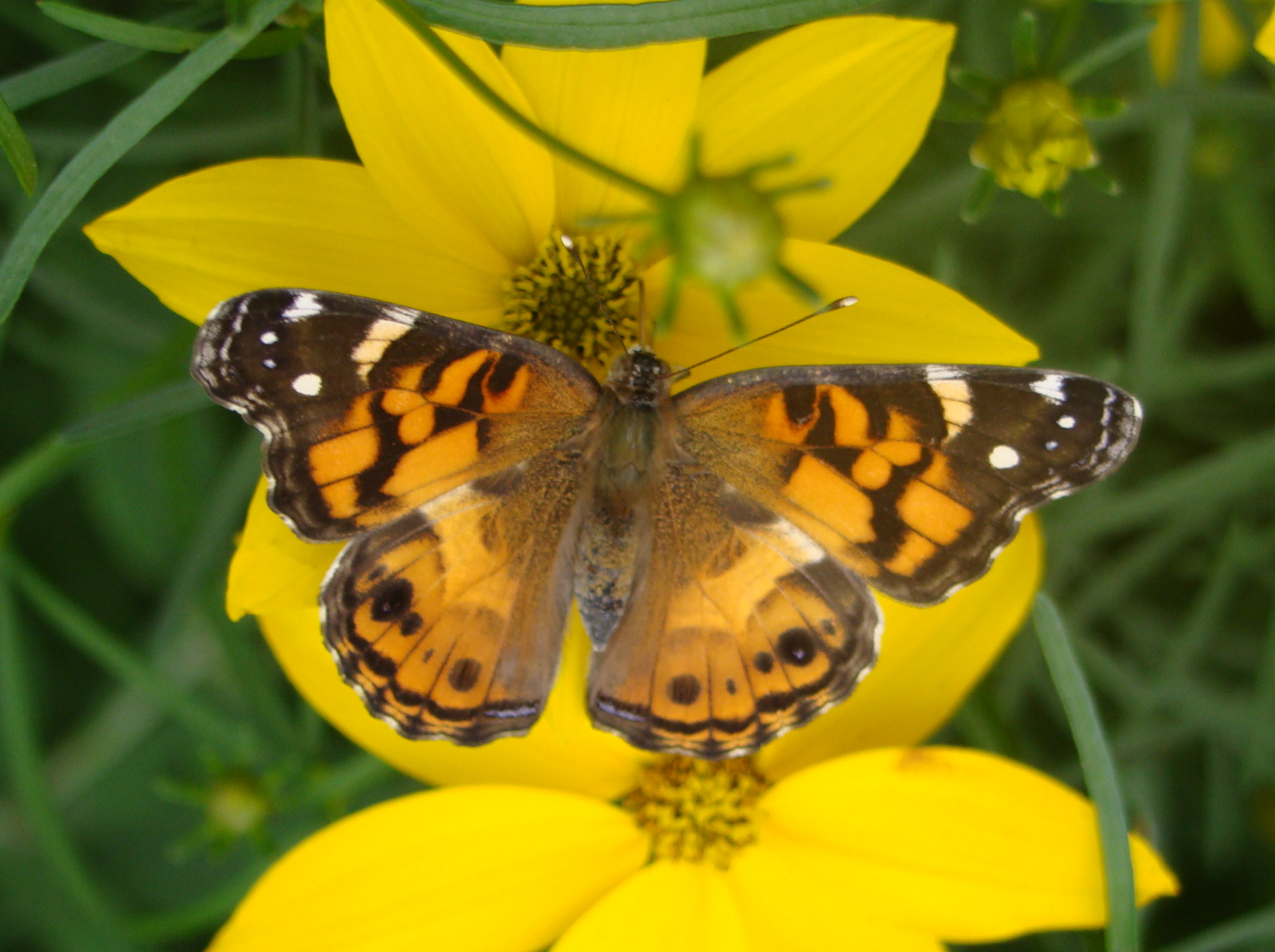
Adult resting on a flower

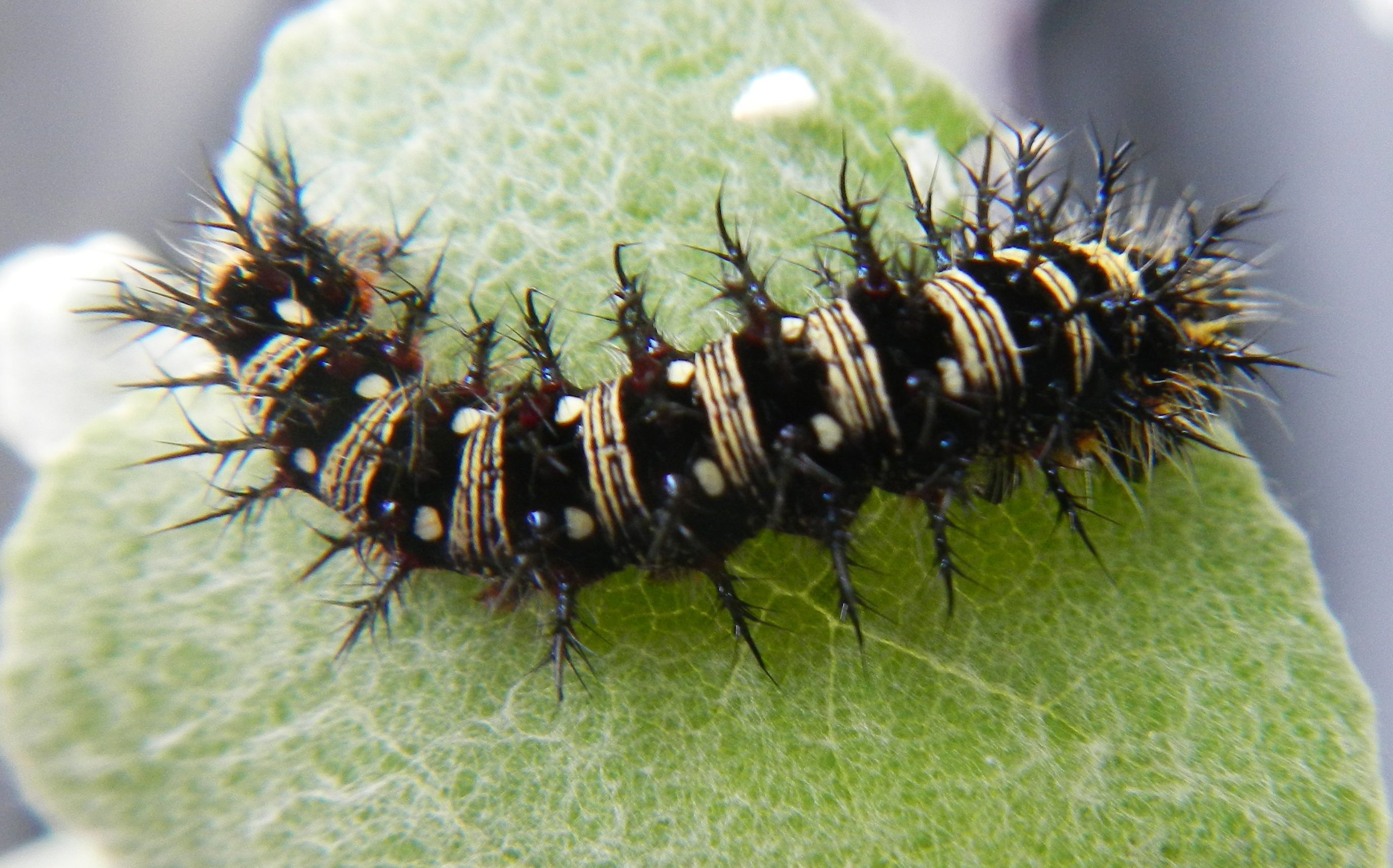
American lady butterfly caterpillar in Wooster, Ohio, United States

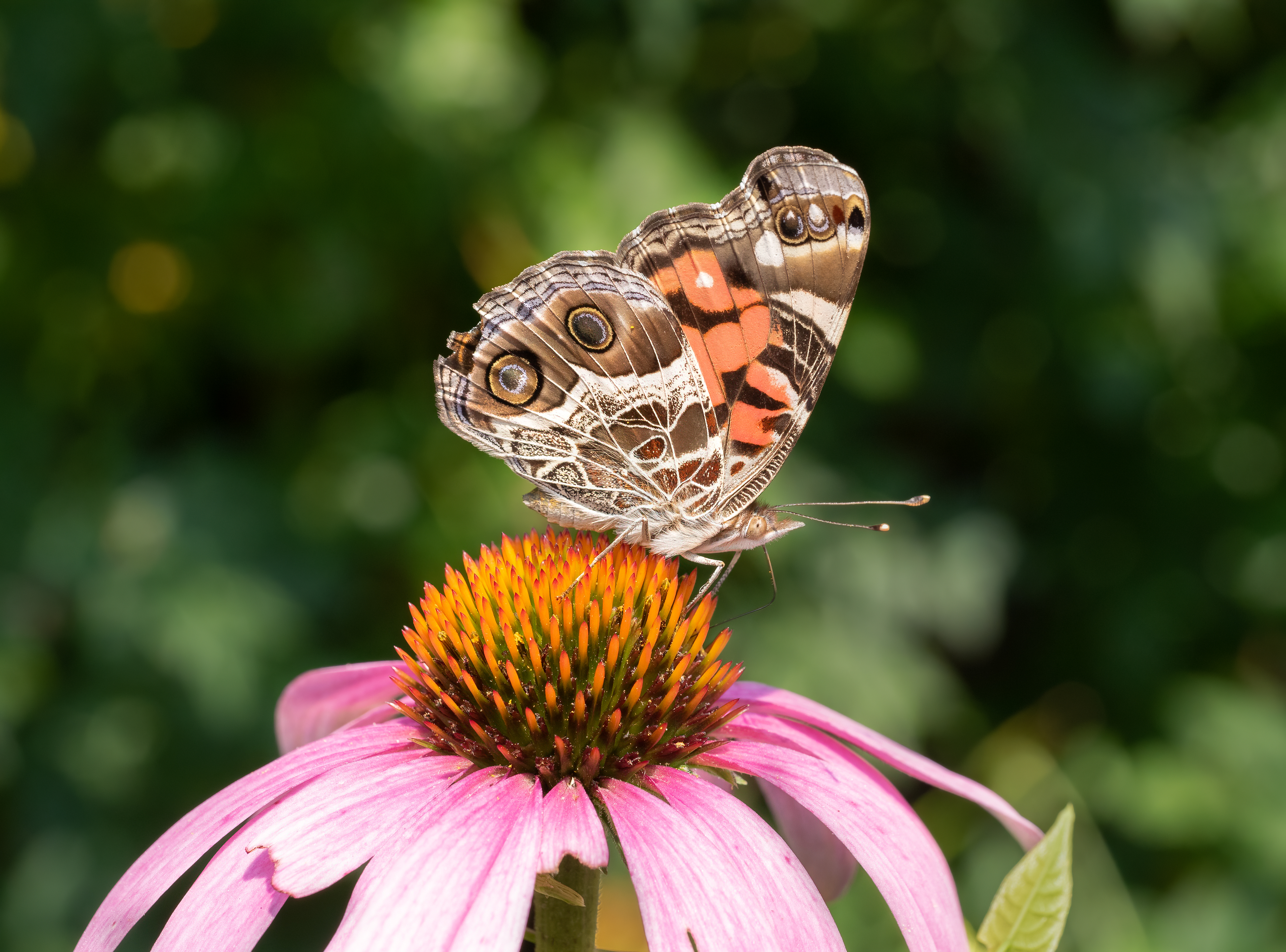
American lady on purple coneflower in Brooklyn, New York

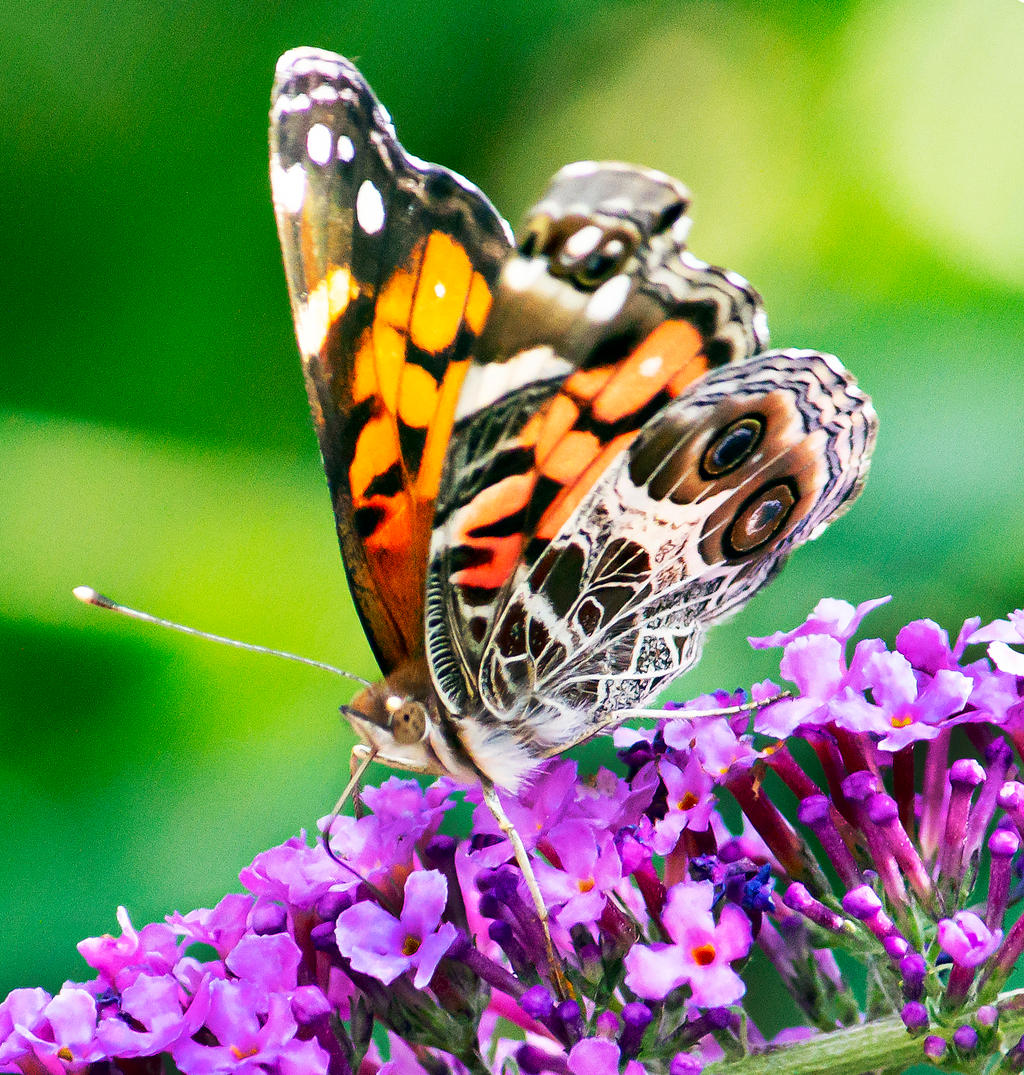
American lady butterfly (Vanessa virginiensis) on Butterfly Bush

== See also ==
- Cynthia (butterfly)
