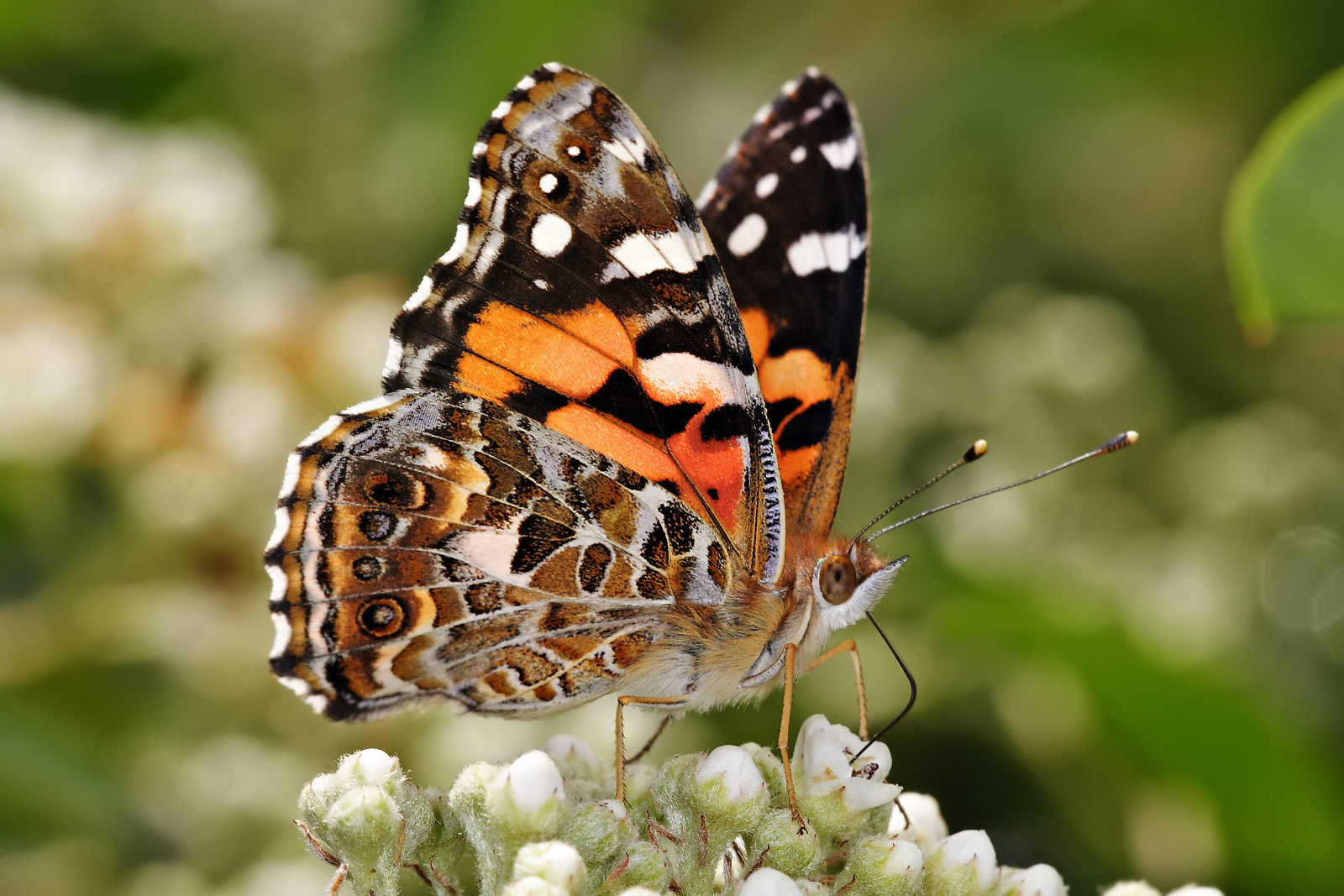
- Victoria, Australia

Scientific classification
- Kingdom: Animalia
- Phylum: Arthropoda
- Clade: Pancrustacea
- Class: Insecta
- Order: Lepidoptera
- Family: Nymphalidae
- Genus: Vanessa
- Species: V. kershawi

Binomial name
- Vanessa kershawi (McCoy, 1868)

Synonyms
- Cynthia kershawi McCoy, 1868; Vanessa cardui kershawi

= Australian painted lady =

Species of butterfly

The Australian painted lady (Vanessa kershawi) is a species of butterfly mostly confined to Australia, although westerly winds have dispersed it to islands east of Australia, including New Zealand. Debate surrounds the taxonomy of this species. Some believe that the Australian painted lady should be a subspecies of the painted lady (Vanessa cardui) due to the similarity in lifestyle and behaviour. Furthermore, the painted lady is found around the globe, but Australia is the only location in which it varies enough to be considered a separate species.

However, due to the distinct genitalia of the males, and variation in colouration, many others consider the Australian painted lady to be a separate species. During spring, adult butterflies migrate south in large numbers from northern states of Queensland and New South Wales. To find mates, male Australian painted ladies exhibit territorial behaviour, which involves a male perching on vegetation in a sunny spot on a hilltop, waiting for females to fly by.

Despite urbanization and invasive plants altering its habitat, populations of Australian painted ladies have not been significantly impacted by these changes.

== Description ==
The Australian painted lady is remarkably similar to the painted lady (Vanessa cardui). It is differentiated by its smaller size, rarely exceeding 2 inches (5 cm) across its wings, and the blue colouration at the centre of the four eyespots on its hindwings. Its body is dark brown, almost black, all over, except the tips of the antenna which are white. The base of the wings are brown, which turns into a brick-red colouration, broken by bands of black. The tips of the forewing are black with four white dots running from the apex of the wing, and a white bar extending from the leading edge of the forewing. The hindwings have four round eyespots at their base, with a blue centre for at least three. The underwings are almost identical to the upperwings, except the base of the underwings is brick red rather than brown. The Australian painted lady's colouration allows it to blend in effectively with the ground. Males and females look almost identical. The ovum is translucent green and barrel-shaped with 13 to 15 vertical ribs. Right before hatching, the black head and grey-tinted body appear through the shell. The larva is grey with pale yellow stripes along each side of its body, yellow dots, and has rows of branched spines covering its body. Its head is typically brown or black, and the caterpillar grows to about 3 cm. The pupa is brown with darker markings, and four pairs of metallic silver or gold dots.

== Taxonomy ==
The Australian painted lady belongs to the family Nymphalidae and genus Vanessa, which compromises 22 species, which are strongly migratory. The Australian painted lady is similar to the near-cosmopolitan painted lady (V. cardui), so it considered by some to be a subspecies of that. However, throughout its range, the painted lady does not exhibit much variation, but the male genitalia of the Australian painted lady is distinct from that of the painted lady, which suggests that it is a separate species. The Australian species' four ventral eyespots are less clearly defined, and it always sports at least three (often four) conspicuous blue pupil spots on each dorsal hindwings' eyespots. V. cardui has either a few tiny pupil spots, or more often, none at all.

The Australian painted and the painted lady have very similar lifestyles and behaviours, but the Australian painted lady lives in an arid and stressful environment. Australian painted lady colouration could be induced in painted lady butterflies by injecting the larvae with stress-inducing hormones and subjecting them to lowered temperatures. This demonstrates the phenotypic plasticity, or the tendency for visible traits to vary with changing environmental conditions, of the painted lady butterflies. It also suggests that the painted lady is the ancestral form, and environmental stress slowly drove speciation by adaptation into the Australian painted lady. In other words, the Australian painted lady most likely evolved from the painted lady due to the environmental conditions in Australia.

== Distribution ==
The Australian painted lady's distribution is restricted to Australia. The closely related V. cardui is found throughout the rest of the world, so the two species have an allopatric distribution. Within Australia, the Australian painted lady is commonly found throughout southern Australia, below the Tropic of Capricorn. It is uncommon to find this butterfly in Queensland, and it is completely absent from the far north of the country, in the tropical rainforests. Although it is most common in Australia, it has also become common throughout New Zealand following periodic migrations across the sea, from Australia. Since the butterflies do not reproduce or overwinter in New Zealand, they are only considered an established species in Australia. Within its range, it is found in urban areas.

== Life history ==
The life cycle of the Australian painted lady lasts around 53 days in the summer. The females lay eggs in the centre of the leaf of food plants. The eggs are green and hatch in about three days. As a caterpillar, the Australian painted lady is only active at night, during which its main activity is feeding. During the day, it hides in a curled leaf or at the foot of a food plant. The pupa hangs vertically from the underside of the leaf of a food plant, and the duration of the pupal stage is about two weeks.

=== Food sources ===
The Australian painted lady typically uses the native Australian everlastings and other daisies as a host and food plant. However, it also feeds on several introduced species, including capeweed (Arctotheca calendula), Scotch thistle (Onopordum acanthium), and lavender (Lavandula angustifolia). The adults feed on the nectar of flowers.

=== Host plants ===
Eggs have being recorded on Arctotis, Chrysanthemum (family Asteraceae) and Scotch thistle (Cirsium vulgare), but the resulting larvae do not survive past the first instar on these plants. Successful larvae have been observed on capeweed (Cryptostemma) and cudweed (Gnaphalium). The results are limited, usually causing malformations on everlasting daisies Helichrysum bracteatum and Helichrysum bellidioides. If leaves are not sufficient, then they eat flowers. Individuals reared on capeweed produce foul-smelling imagos. Other food plants have been recorded in Australia, but do not appear to be used in New Zealand.

== Behaviour ==
=== Mating system and territoriality ===
The Australian painted lady's mating system evolved due to a highly dispersed female population. Food and oviposition sites are abundant as females feed on a wide range of host plants; therefore females do not cluster around hotspots of resources. This tendency makes it impossible for a male to defend the whole of a female's range. Therefore the best strategy for males is to defend a territory in which females are likely to travel. Females generally visit male territories only when they are receptive, for the purpose of copulating. However when an abundant food source attracts a significant number of females, males no longer exhibit territoriality and are seen searching for mates in areas where females are clustered.

To defend a territory the male exhibits perching behaviour starting in the mid- to late afternoon until dusk. Some individuals are able to reclaim the same territory several afternoons in a row. The longest period of time recorded in which one male defended the same territory was three days. The males choose sunny spots on hilltops through which females are likely to travel. If no hilltops are available, the males wait in channels in the vegetation that would funnel wandering females towards them. The perching male sits and waits, scanning the sky for any moving object. Periodically he executes a patrol flight to get a better picture of the surrounding area. When the male spots a moving flying object, he flies straight towards it. If it is a male, the resident male chases him off his territory. If it is a female, the male chases it, more slowly and less aggressively than an intruding male, away from the perch site. The pair lands and copulates, a process that can last more than an hour.

=== Migration ===
==== Australia ====
Observations of the Australian painted lady migration date back to the 1960s. In 1963, a large migration took place in a south-easterly direction from late August to late September. It was characterized by the species becoming suddenly common in certain areas where it had previously been sparse. That year was noted to have been unusually wet in Australia. This could be a trait shared with V. cardui, which migrates in Europe during the wet season. The Australian painted lady migrates south in the spring and summer, and north in the autumn and winter.

Migrating butterflies often have smaller and lighter body sizes that allow them to fly longer distances. Additionally, these butterflies tend to have larger wing-to-body ratios. Temperatures and day length have been found to influence development. When larvae were exposed to short days and cool temperatures (20 °C), similar to conditions found in the spring, larval development was accelerated. This produced small adults with low body weights, ideal for migration. A similar phenomenon occurred when the larvae were exposed to longer days at warm temperatures (30 °C), conditions similar to those in the late summer. Seasonal changes could trigger the development of spring and fall body forms that are ideal for the migration patterns described above.

==== New Zealand ====
During periods of large migration in Australia, and with the possible help of strong winds, the Australian painted lady migrates across the sea to New Zealand, typically only appearing during October to November. Multiple occurrences of this butterfly in New Zealand were reported in the 1960s. In the spring of 1968, they appeared on the western coast of New Zealand near the sea, and were unusually abundant. The species is unlikely to be established in New Zealand, as no instances of larvae or adults hibernating through the winter were found. Although some individuals reproduced and laid eggs, the larvae only developed to the first instar before development stopped. The same phenomenon occurred in the late summer 1969, and coincided with a gale-force westerly wind. This evidence suggests that the butterflies observed in the spring of 1968 and the summer of 1969 were the result of a new migration from Australia, and not the offspring of a generation of previously migrated painted ladies. The migration of butterflies and moths from Australia is not uncommon in summers with strong winds.

=== Response to a changing environment ===
Fragmented habitats due to urbanization, as well as disturbances to the environment from humans and introduced species, are harmful to most butterflies. Additionally, threats occur to local vegetation such as recreation, trampling of vegetation, fire regimes, and introduction of plant pathogens, which bring about changes to local plant community. Distribution of butterflies depends heavily on the site characteristics and the density of that species' host plants. Changing plant composition changes the distribution of most butterflies' range, isolating them to pockets where the vegetation is ideal. Because of the variety of host plants used by Australian painted ladies, it has not been significantly affected by these changes. It has been found to use some species of carduine thistles, which are invasive to Australia, as host plants in New South Wales. Australian painted ladies use the plants as hosts during their larval stage, and as food sources. However, they inflict little damage to the plant.

== Gallery ==
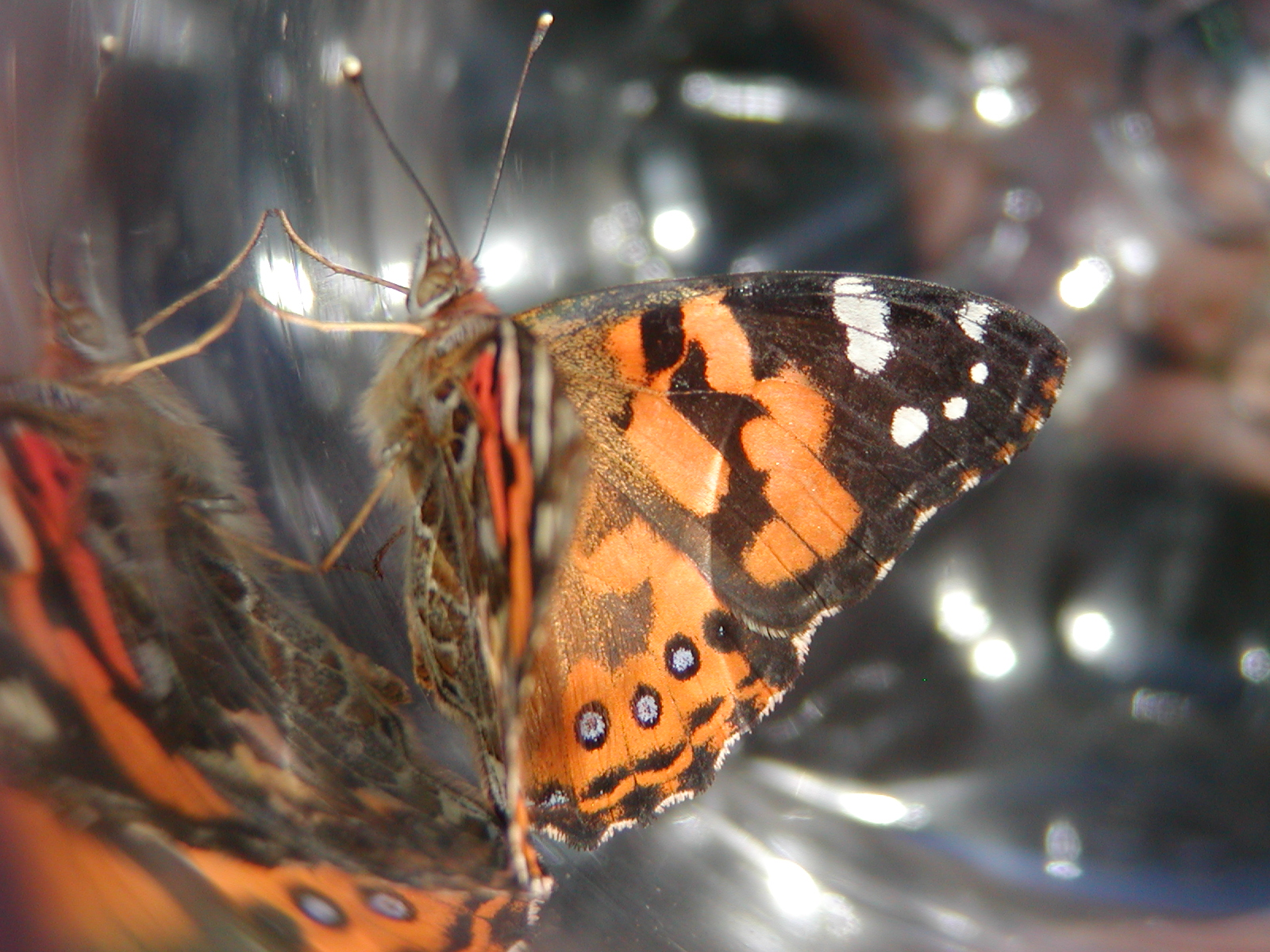
V. kershawi adult soon after hatching - note the blue centre of hindwing eyespots.

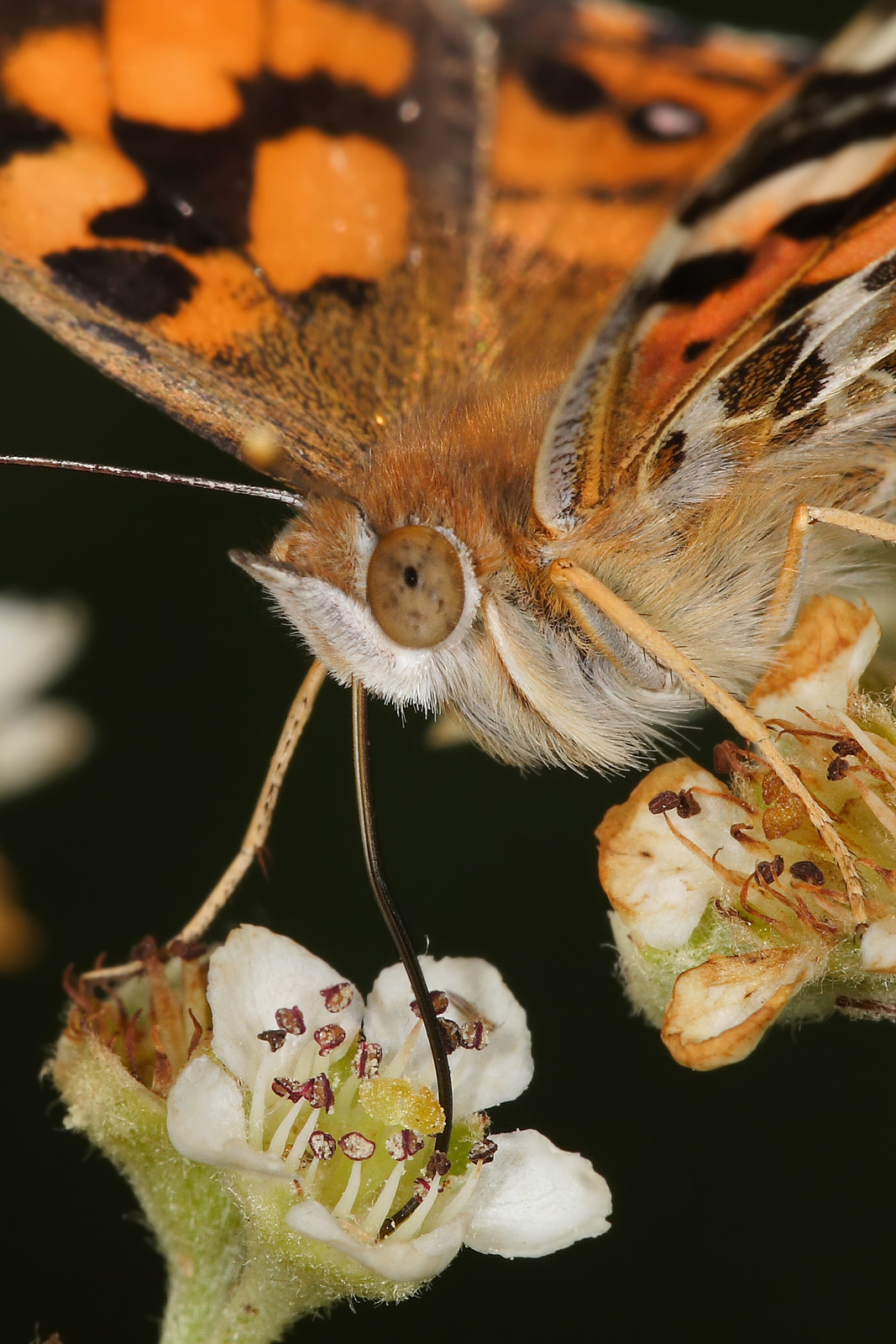
Australian painted lady feeding

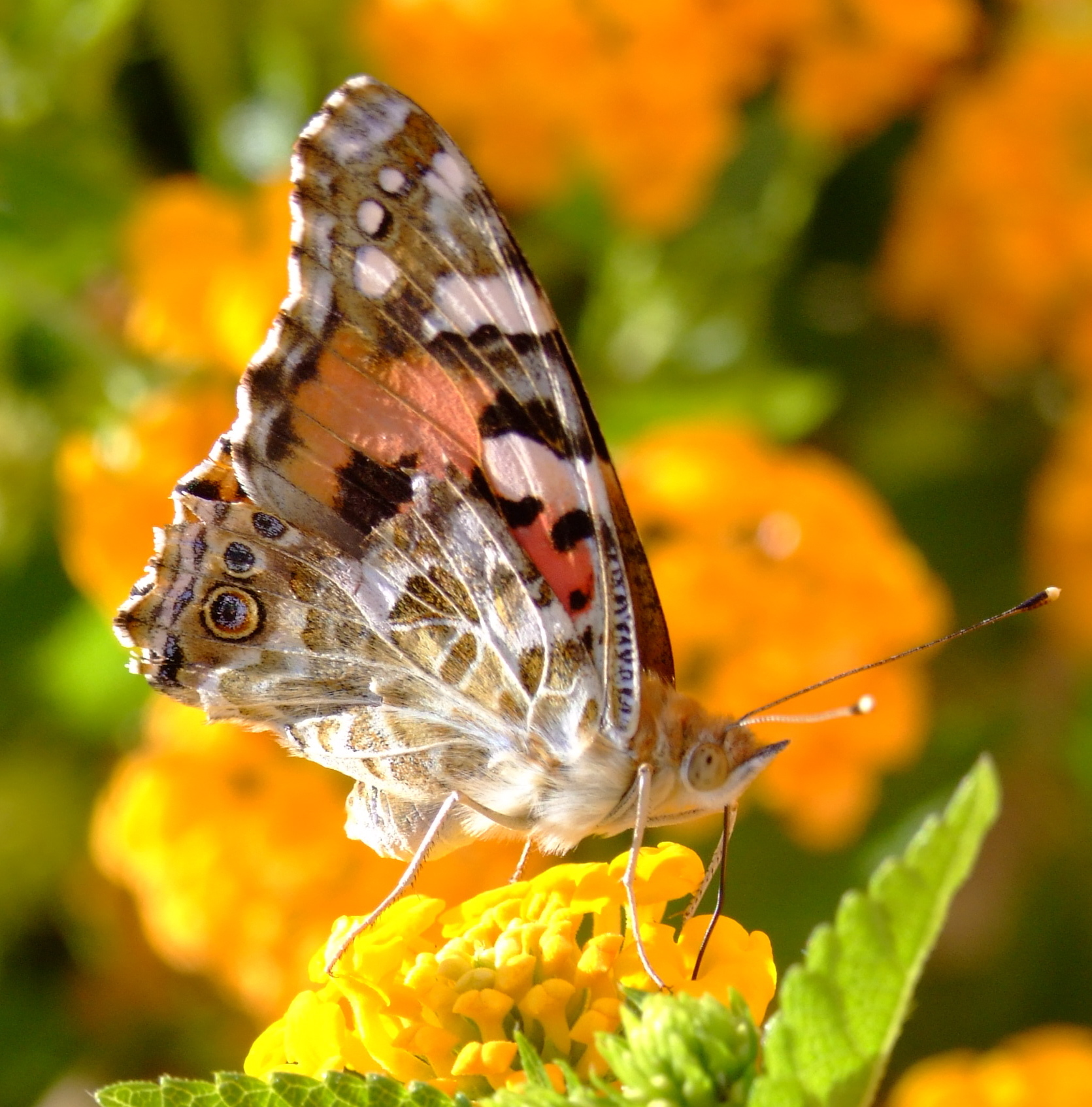
Australian painted lady on yellow flower

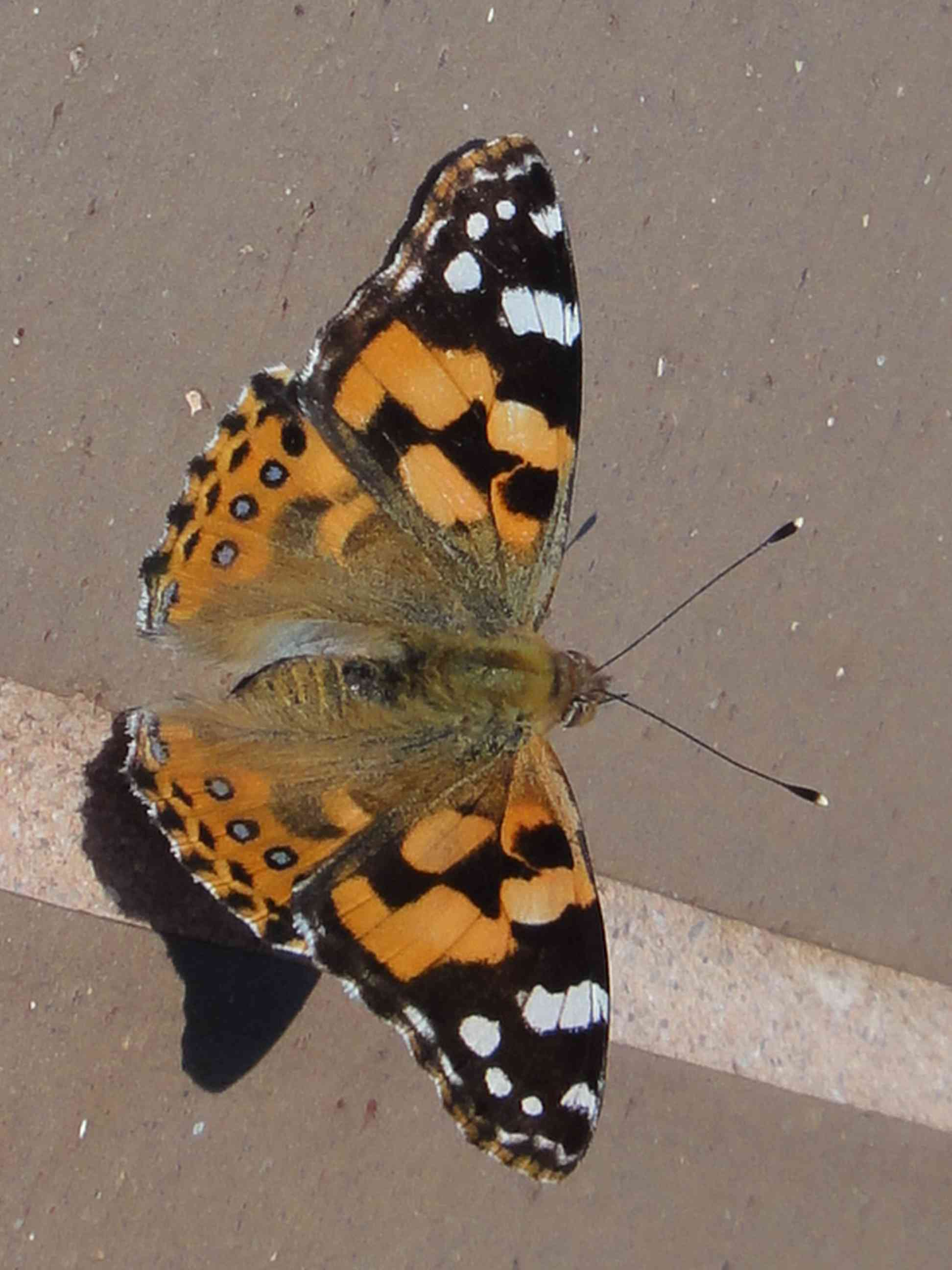
Australian painted lady resting on a terrace in Victoria

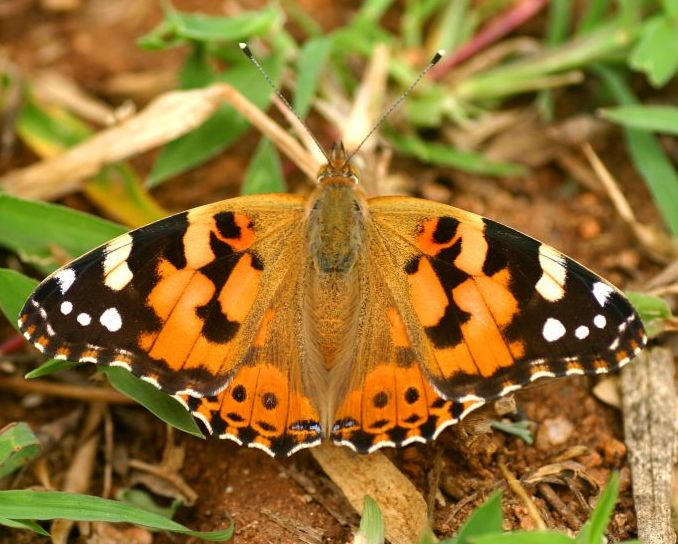
V. cardui, a related species, compare hindwing eyespots

== See also ==
- Cynthia (butterfly)
