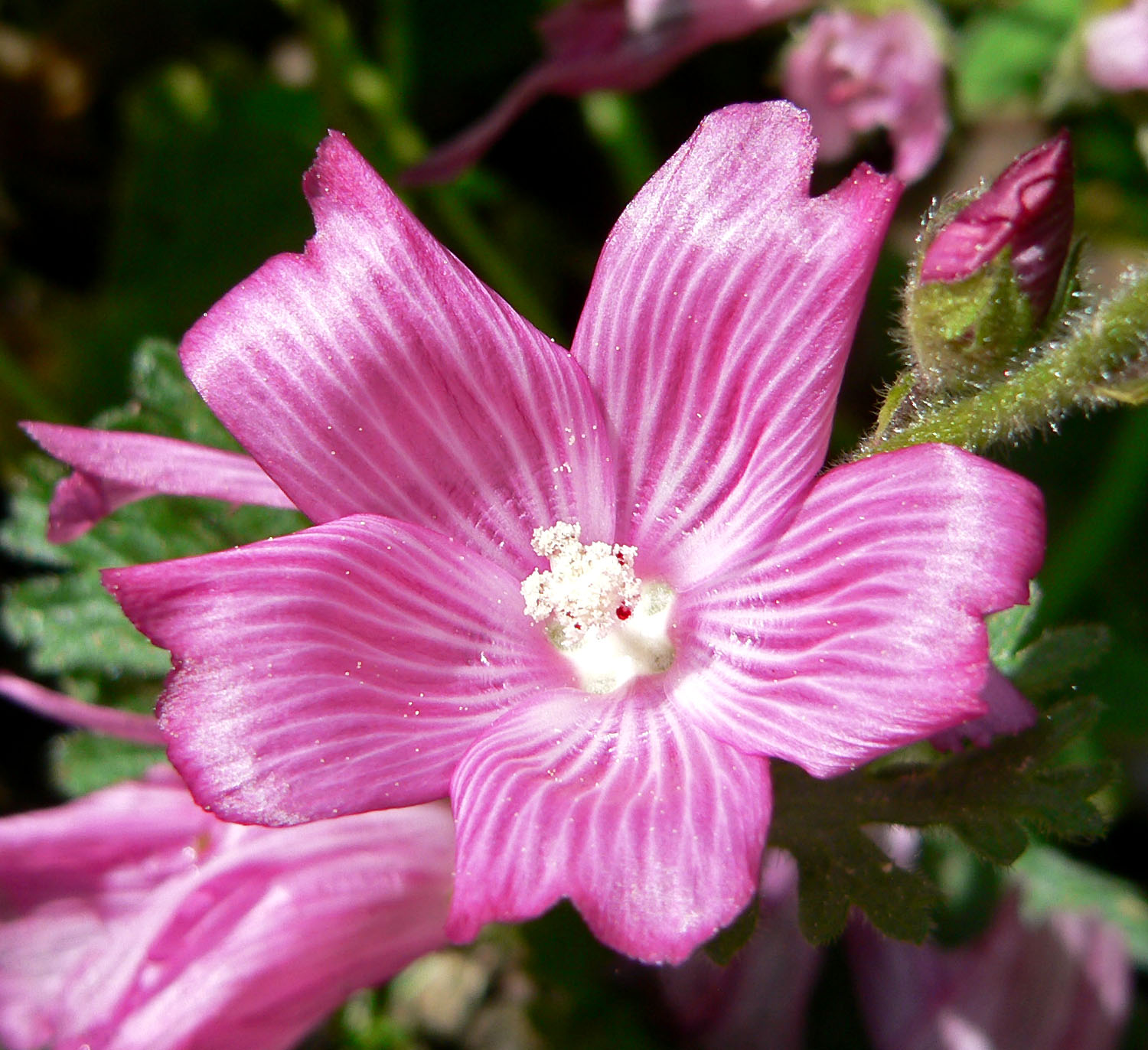
- Sidalcea malviflora ssp. malviflora

Conservation status
- Secure (NatureServe)

Scientific classification
- Kingdom: Plantae
- Clade: Tracheophytes
- Clade: Angiosperms
- Clade: Eudicots
- Clade: Rosids
- Order: Malvales
- Family: Malvaceae
- Genus: Sidalcea
- Species: S. malviflora

Binomial name
- Sidalcea malviflora (DC.) A.Gray ex Benth.

= Sidalcea malviflora =

Species of flowering plant

Sidalcea malviflora is a species of flowering plant in the mallow family, known by the common names dwarf checkerbloom, Greek mallow, prairie mallow and dwarf checkermallow.

== Distribution ==
Sidalcea malviflora is native to the West Coast of the United States, from Washington to California, and into northwestern Baja California. It is a common plant of chaparral, coastal sage scrub, and other habitat types.

== Description ==
Sidalcea malviflora is somewhat variable in appearance and there are many subspecies. In general it is a perennial herb growing from a woody caudex and rhizome, its stem reaching about 60 centimeters in maximum height. It is sparsely to densely hairy in texture. The leaf blades are variable in shape, but are often divided deeply into several lobes. The inflorescence is a dense or loose array of several flowers. The flower has five petals in shades of bright to dark pink, often with white veining, and measuring one to over three centimeters in length.

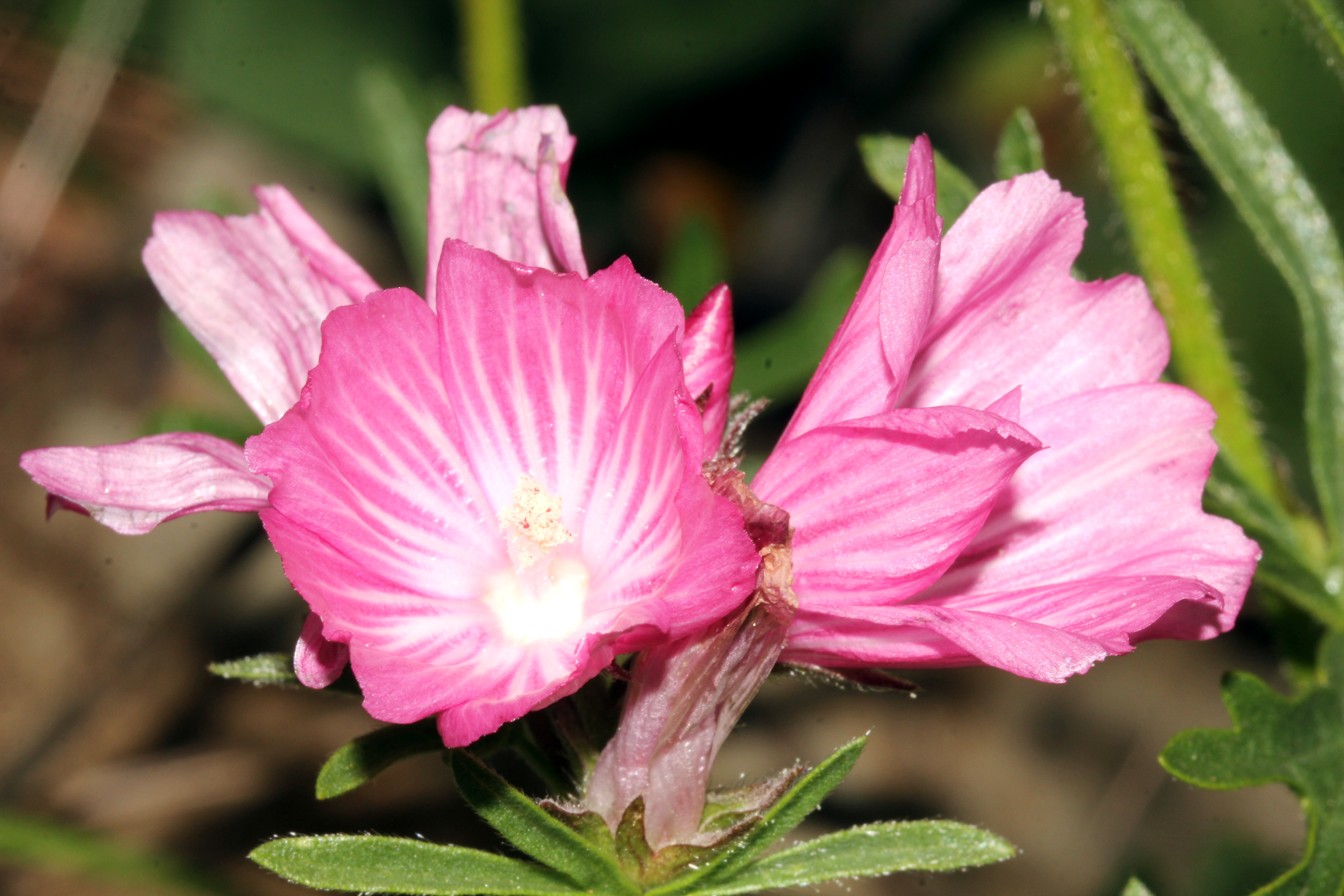
Flower of Sidalcea malviflora ssp. laciniata.

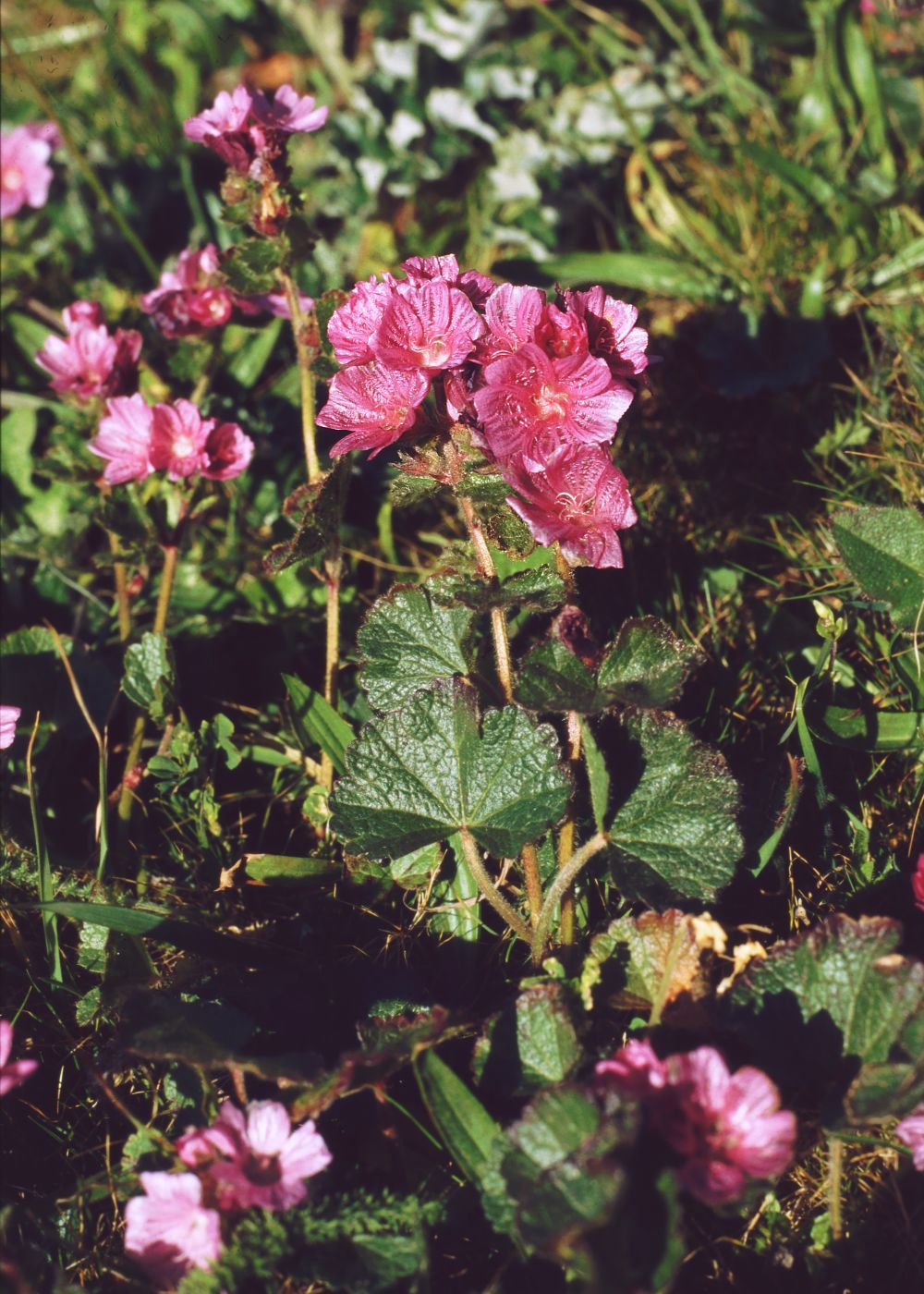
Sidalcea malviflora.

== Subspecies and endemics ==
There are over ten subspecies, some of which are endemic and rare:. They include:

- Sidalcea malviflora ssp. californica — California checkerbloom.
- Sidalcea malviflora ssp. dolosa — endemic to the San Bernardino Mountains.
- Sidalcea malviflora ssp. laciniata
- Sidalcea malviflora ssp. laciniata var. laciniata
- Sidalcea malviflora ssp. laciniata var. sancta
- Sidalcea malviflora ssp. malviflora — Checker mallow
- Sidalcea malviflora ssp. patula — Siskiyou checkerbloom — endemic to far northwestern California and southwestern Oregon.
- Sidalcea malviflora ssp. purpurea — Purple-stemmed checkerbloom — endemic to the California coast just north of the San Francisco Bay Area.
- Sidalcea malviflora ssp. rostrata
- Sidalcea malviflora ssp. virgata — Dwarf checkerbloom

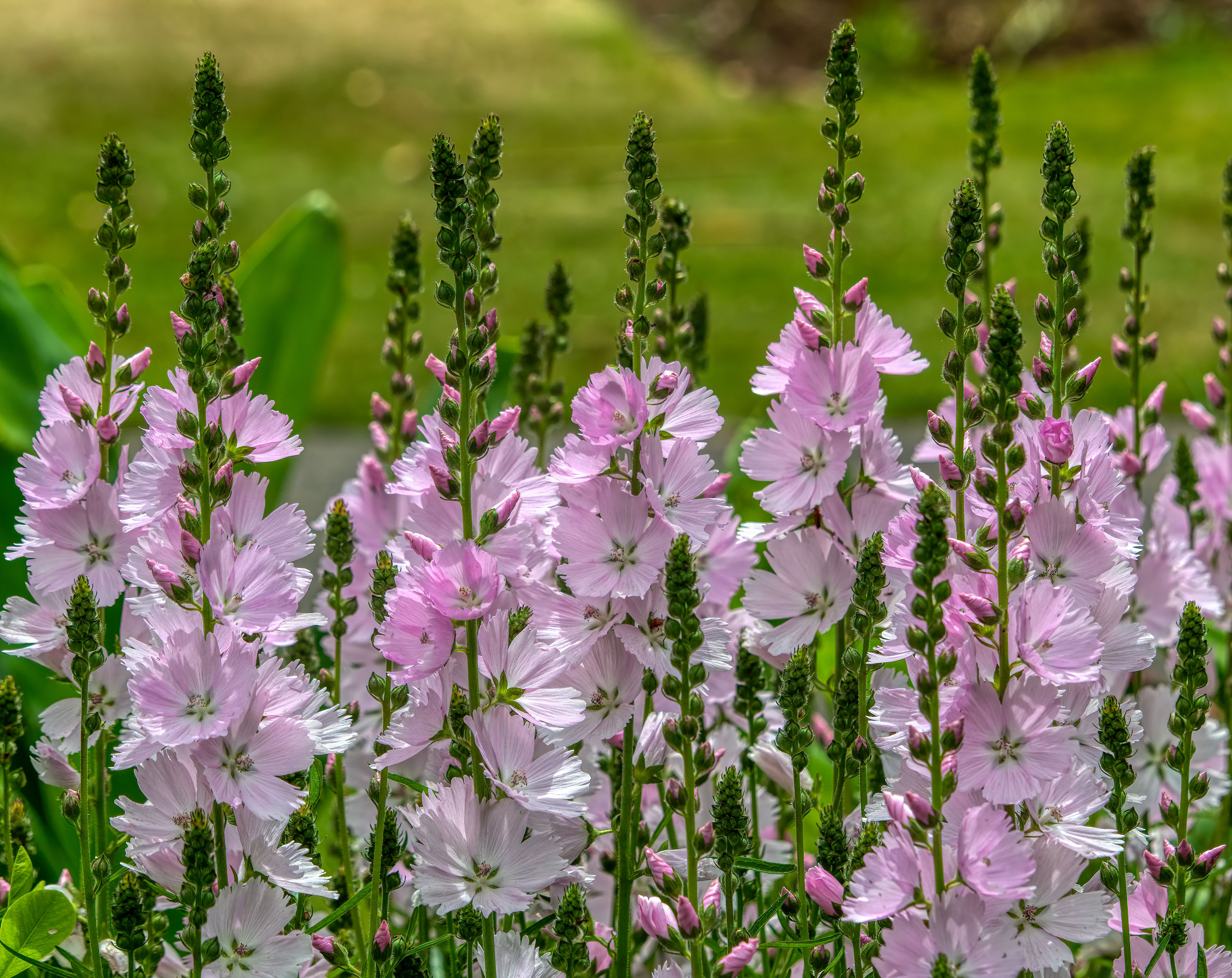
Sidalcea malviflora "Elsie Heugh"

== Cultivation ==
Sidalcea malviflora is cultivated as an ornamental plant, for use in traditional, native plant, water conserving, and wildlife gardens.

Cultivars have been selected for flower colors and size qualities, they include:

- Sidalcea malviflora 'Little Princess'
- Sidalcea malviflora 'Palustre' — Palustre Checkerbloom — more compact and a heavier bloom produced.
- Sidalcea malviflora 'Party Girl'
- Sidalcea malviflora 'Rosanna' — Rosanna Checker Mallow

== Ecology ==
It is a larval host to the West Coast lady.

== See also ==
- California chaparral and woodlands
- California coastal sage and chaparral
