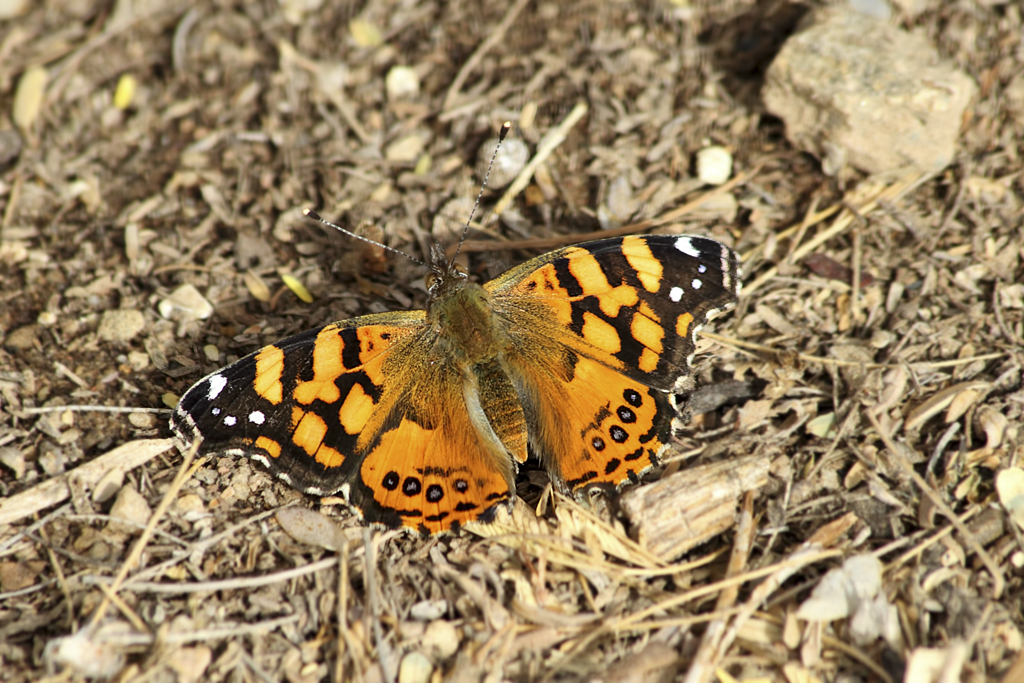

Scientific classification
- Kingdom: Animalia
- Phylum: Arthropoda
- Clade: Pancrustacea
- Class: Insecta
- Order: Lepidoptera
- Family: Nymphalidae
- Genus: Vanessa
- Species: V. annabella

Binomial name
- Vanessa annabella (W. D. Field, 1971)

Synonyms
- Cynthia annabella Field, 1971; Vanessa anabella (lapsus); Vanessa carye annabella

= West Coast lady =

Species of butterfly

The West Coast lady (Vanessa annabella) is one of three North American species of brush-footed butterflies known colloquially as the "painted ladies". V. annabella occurs throughout much of the western US and southwestern Canada. The other two species are the cosmopolitan Vanessa cardui (painted lady) and the eastern Vanessa virginiensis (American painted lady). This species has also been considered a subspecies of the South American Vanessa carye and is frequently misspelled as "anabella".

== Distinguishing features ==
Schematic of standard wing terminology

Aside from general differences in distribution, V. annabella can be distinguished from the other two painted ladies of North America as follows:

Most conspicuously, it lacks obvious ventral eyespots on the hindwings; there are two large ones on V. virginiensis and four small ones on V. cardui. Like the latter, it also lacks a white dot in the pinkish-orange subapical field of the ventral and dorsal forewings. Its upperwing coloration has the purest orange of the three; the American painted lady is usually quite reddish.

A less reliable indicator is the row of black eyespots on the dorsal submarginal hindwing. These are usually of roughly equal size in V. cardui and lack blue centers, though the summer morph may have a few tiny ones. In the other two, usually two eyespots are larger and have more conspicuous blue centers. In V. virginiensis, these normally are the spot at each end of the row, whereas in the present species it is the two middle ones.

== Developmental stages ==
The developmental stages of Vanessa annabella can be divided into eight different stages: first instar larva, second instar larva, third instar larva, fourth instar larva, fifth instar larva, prepupa, pupa, and adult. In their adult stage, there is subtle sexual dimorphism between males and females, as females have a more rounded hindwing compared to their male counterparts. The color pattern is the same on both males and females: "tawny orange with black markings, white subapical forewing spots, and blue pupilled hindwing ocelli." Their open wing expanse averages generally vary between 40 and 48 mm, with females often being larger than males. The total time it takes for this species to develop is typically between 30 and 36 days.

== Natural history ==
This butterfly is often seen basking in open areas in its habitat. Their habitats are mostly localized to open areas from the Upper Sonoran to the Canadian zones. The West Coast Lady is a multiple brooded species, meaning that there are more than one set of offspring within a single breeding season. Sightings of this butterfly have been captured from May to December in Huntington Beach by Ron Vanderhoff. Most captures of this butterfly are usually made in April and May. They are generally distributed in Orange County in places of lower elevations.

Vanessa annabella feeds on plants in the families of Malvaceae and Urticaceae. In Southern California, the common native hostplants include Urtica holosericea (Urticaceae), Sida species, Sphaeralcea ambigua (Malvaceae), and Sidalcea malviflora (Malvaceae). Their eggs are pale green and are laid singly on the upperside of the hostplant leaves. Additionally, their pupation sites are either on the leaves of the hostplant or on nearby objects such as twigs or branches.

Both the males and females of the species visit flowers. During the afternoon, males are typically found congregating in areas such as hilltops, forest openings, glades, meadows, streamside slopes, and patches of dry earth which are particularly suitable for basking in the sun. At these areas, males spend a large amount of time and energy chasing each other and sometimes engaging in courtship and mating with females. Though females do not congregate in a similar manner to the males, they are likely to be found on hilltops feeding, seeking foodplants, or ovipositing.

== See also ==
- Cynthia (butterfly)
- Vanessa carye
