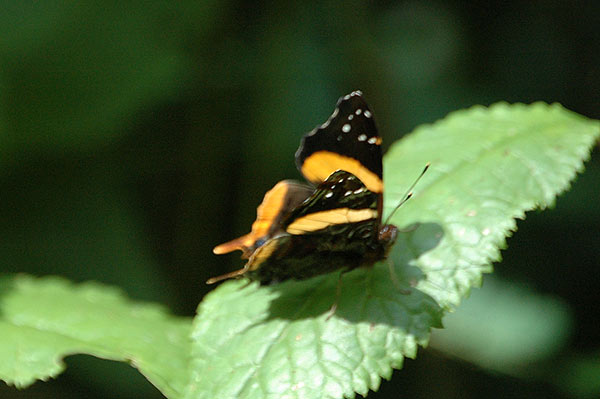

Scientific classification
- Kingdom: Animalia
- Phylum: Arthropoda
- Class: Insecta
- Order: Lepidoptera
- Family: Nymphalidae
- Genus: Antanartia
- Species: A. schaeneia

Binomial name
- Antanartia schaeneia (Trimen, 1879)

Synonyms
- Eurema schaeneia Trimen, 1879; Hypanartia commixta Butler, 1880; Antanartia nigerrimus Stoneham, 1934

= Antanartia schaeneia =

Long tail admiral

Species of butterfly

Antanartia schaeneia, the long tail admiral or long-tailed admiral, is a butterfly of the family Nymphalidae. It is found in eastern Africa.

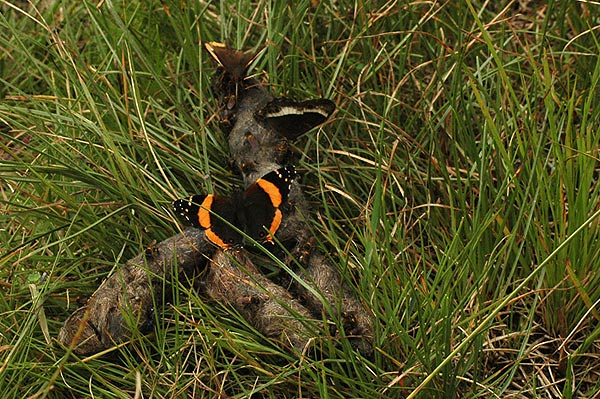

Both sexes are attracted to fermented fruit and males mud-puddle.

The larvae feed on Fleurya capensis, Boehmeria nivea, Australina, Boehmeria, Pouzolzia, and Urtica species.

== Subspecies ==
- Antanartia schaeneia schaeneia (Cape, Natal, Transvaal)
- Antanartia schaeneia dubia (eastern Rhodesia to Malawi, Tanzania, Kenya, Uganda, Rwanda, eastern Zaire)
- Antanartia schaeneia diluta (Ethiopia)
