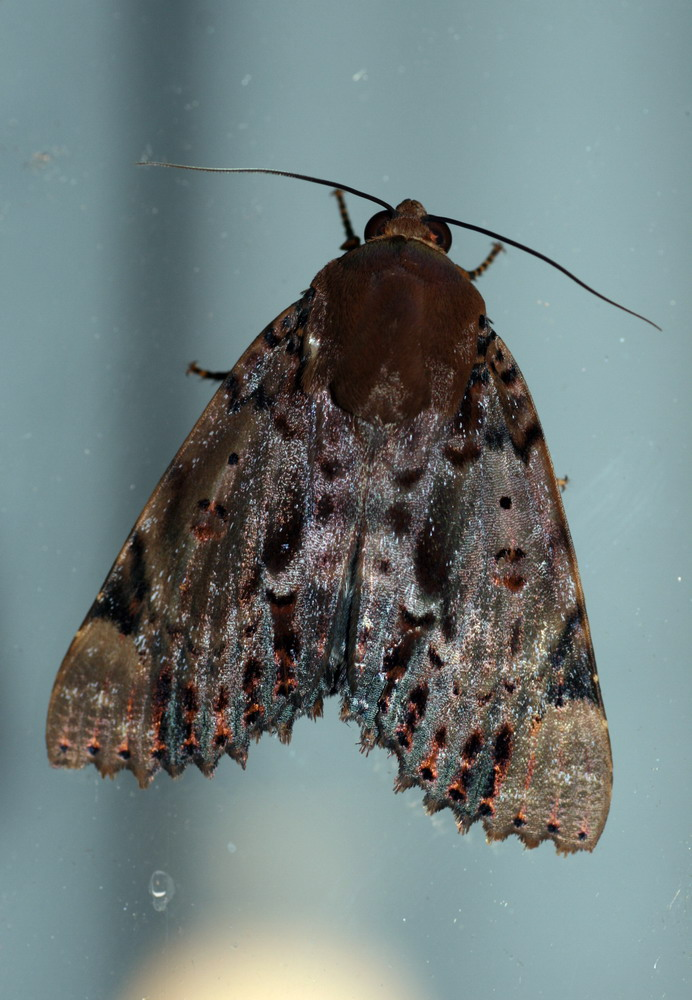

Scientific classification
- Kingdom: Animalia
- Phylum: Arthropoda
- Clade: Pancrustacea
- Class: Insecta
- Order: Lepidoptera
- Superfamily: Noctuoidea
- Family: Noctuidae
- Genus: Arcte
- Species: A. coerula

Binomial name
- Arcte coerula (Guenée, 1852)

Synonyms
- Cocytodes coerula Guenée, 1852; Arcte coerulea; Cocytodes caerulea

= Arcte coerula =

Ramie moth

Species of moth

Arcte coerula, the ramie moth, is a moth of the family Noctuidae. The species was first described by Achille Guenée in 1852. It is found from in south-east Asia, including Fiji, India, Sri Lanka, Myanmar, Japan, New Guinea, Taiwan and Norfolk Island. It has been recently observed in Hawaii, on the island of Maui.

== Description ==
Its wingspan is about 84 mm. The mid and hind tibia are spiny. Hindwings of male with long hairy inner margin. Head black and thorax vinous reddish brown. Pectus white. Abdomen bluish fuscous with a white tuft in male below claspers. Forewings with brown suffused with black, except costal area as far as postmedial line and the apical area, and sprinkled with a few bluish-white scales. A short almost basal line, two black sub-basal patches, an oblique waved antemedial line present. A black spot in cell and two lunules at end of cell. Traces of a pale waved sub-marginal line can be seen. Hindwings are black with a bright blue patch on disk and a maculate post-medial band and patch near anal angle.

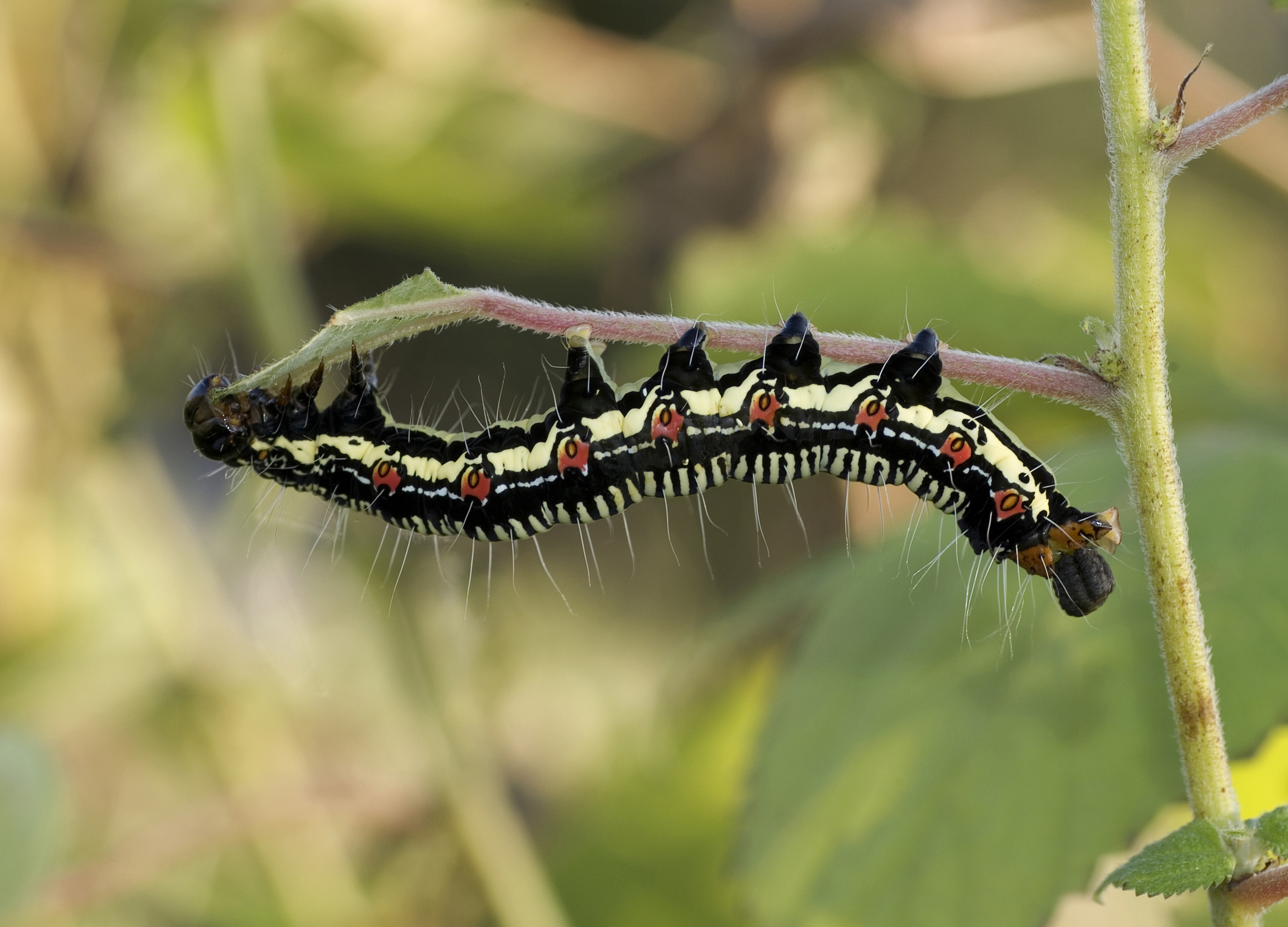
Caterpillar

Larva black. Somites with transverse dorsal white bars each enclosing a black line. Stigmata ochreous, black ridges and with some red color around, situated on white patches from near the top of each of which springs a white hair. There is an inter-spiracular disconnected white line and a broader spiracular line with a black spot from which springs a white hair below each spiracle. A broad ventral white band present. The 11th somite humped and black above. Extremity orange above spotted with black. Head and somites are covered with long white hairs.

The larvae feed on Boehmeria nipononivea (ramie) and Boehmeria australis. In Hawaii, the larvae have been observed feeding on native Urticaceae, such as Pipturus albidus (māmaki) and Boehmeria grandis ('akolea), food sources for the native Kamehameha butterfly.
