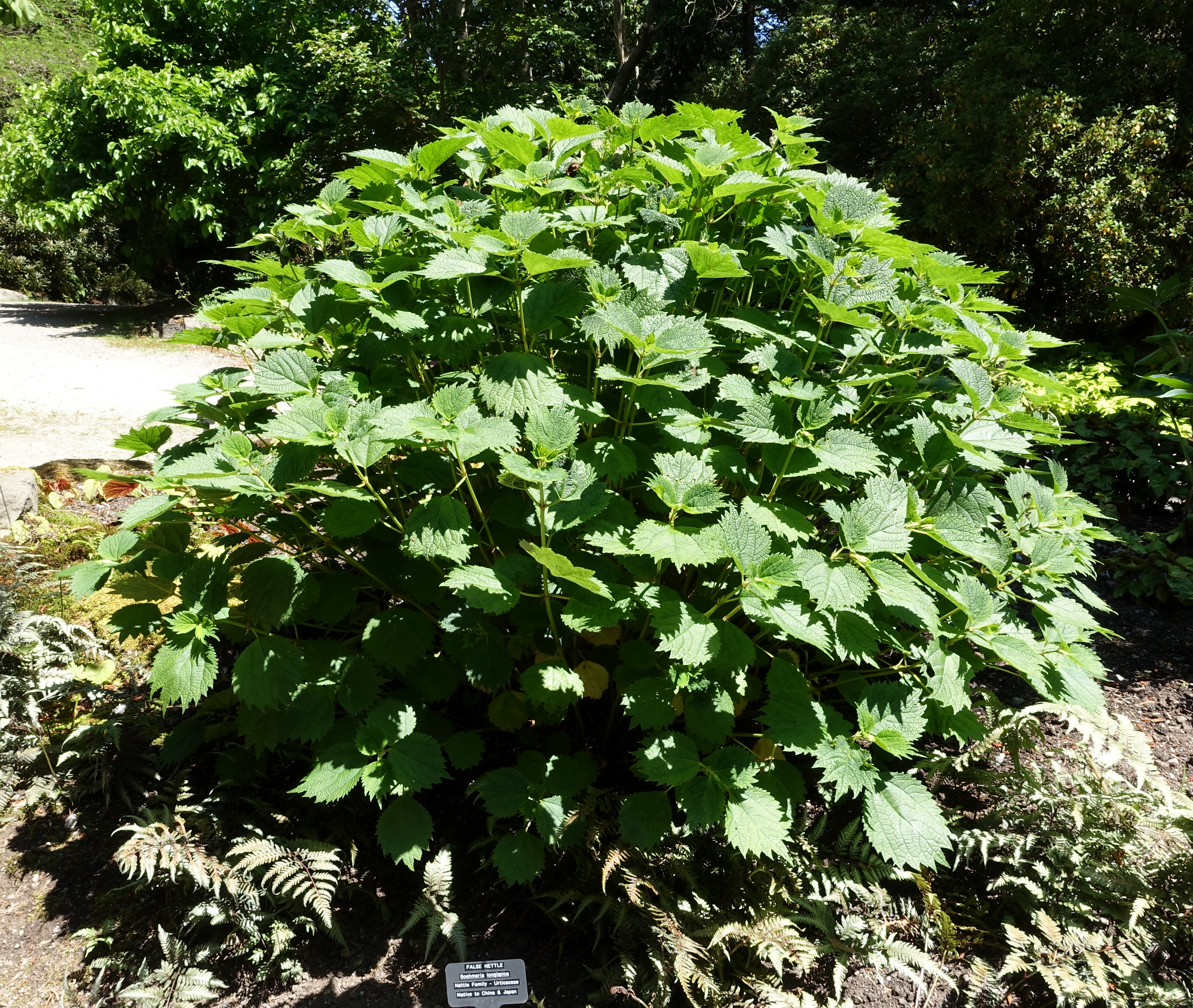
- variety japonica

Scientific classification
- Kingdom: Plantae
- Clade: Embryophytes
- Clade: Tracheophytes
- Clade: Spermatophytes
- Clade: Angiosperms
- Clade: Eudicots
- Clade: Rosids
- Order: Rosales
- Family: Urticaceae
- Genus: Boehmeria
- Species: B. japonica

Binomial name
- Boehmeria japonica (L.f.) Miq.

Synonyms
- Synonymy: Boehmeria grandifolia (Thunb.) Wedd.; Boehmeria hatusimae Satake; Boehmeria japonica var. appendiculata (Blume) Yahara; Boehmeria japonica var. longispica (Steud.) Yahara; Boehmeria longispica Steud.; Boehmeria longispica var. appendiculata Blume; Boehmeria macrophylla var. tomentosa (Wedd.) D.G.Long; Boehmeria miqueliana Tanaka [Illegitimate]; Boehmeria pachystachya Satake; Boehmeria pilushanensis Y.C.Liu & F.Y.Lu; Boehmeria pilushanensis Liu & Lu; Boehmeria platyphylla var. japonica (L.f.) Wedd.; Boehmeria platyphylla var. macrophylla (Thunb.) Wedd.; Boehmeria scabrella (Roxb.) Gaudich.; Boehmeria spicata var. duploserrata Wight; Boehmeria taiwaniana Nakai & Satake; Boehmeria taiwaniana var. pilushanensis (Liu & Lu) S.S.Ying; Duretia longispica (Steud.) Nakai; Ramium japonicum Kuntze; Urtica japonica L. f.

= Boehmeria japonica =

Species of flowering plant

Boehmeria japonica is a species of flowering plant in the nettle family (Urticaceae). It native to eastern Asia, where it is found in China, Japan, South Korea, and Taiwan.

Its natural habitat is extremely variable, being found in areas that range from wet to dry, and from shaded to open. It is tolerant of disturbance, and can be found growing on walls and roadsides. It is considered to be a common species in most of Japan.

== Description ==
It is perennial subshrub or herb, growing to 5 m in height. Its leaves are dark green, ovate, and with upwardly-curving teeth. It produces small green flowers in the summer.

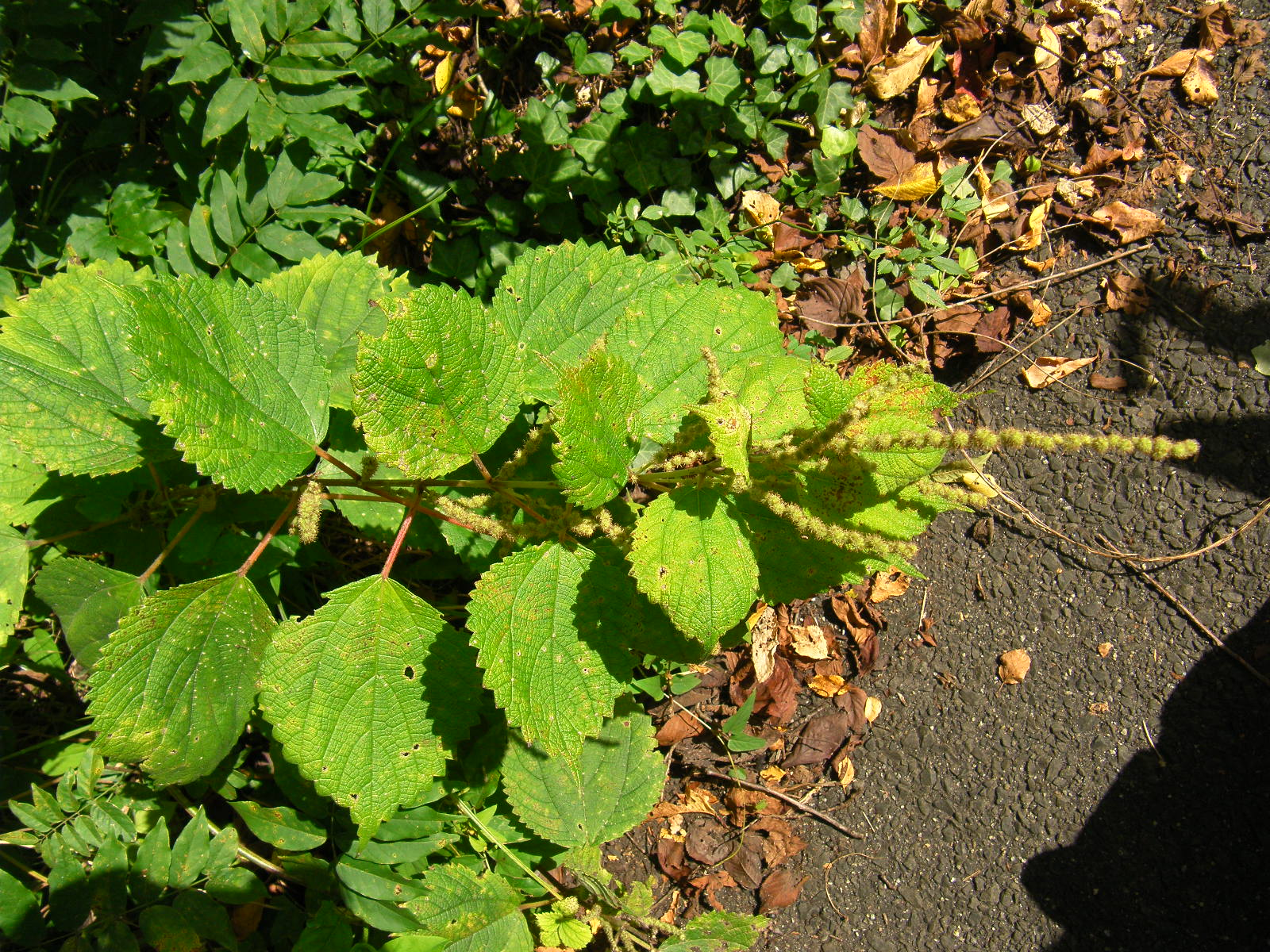
Variety japonica, showing thick leaves with many teeth

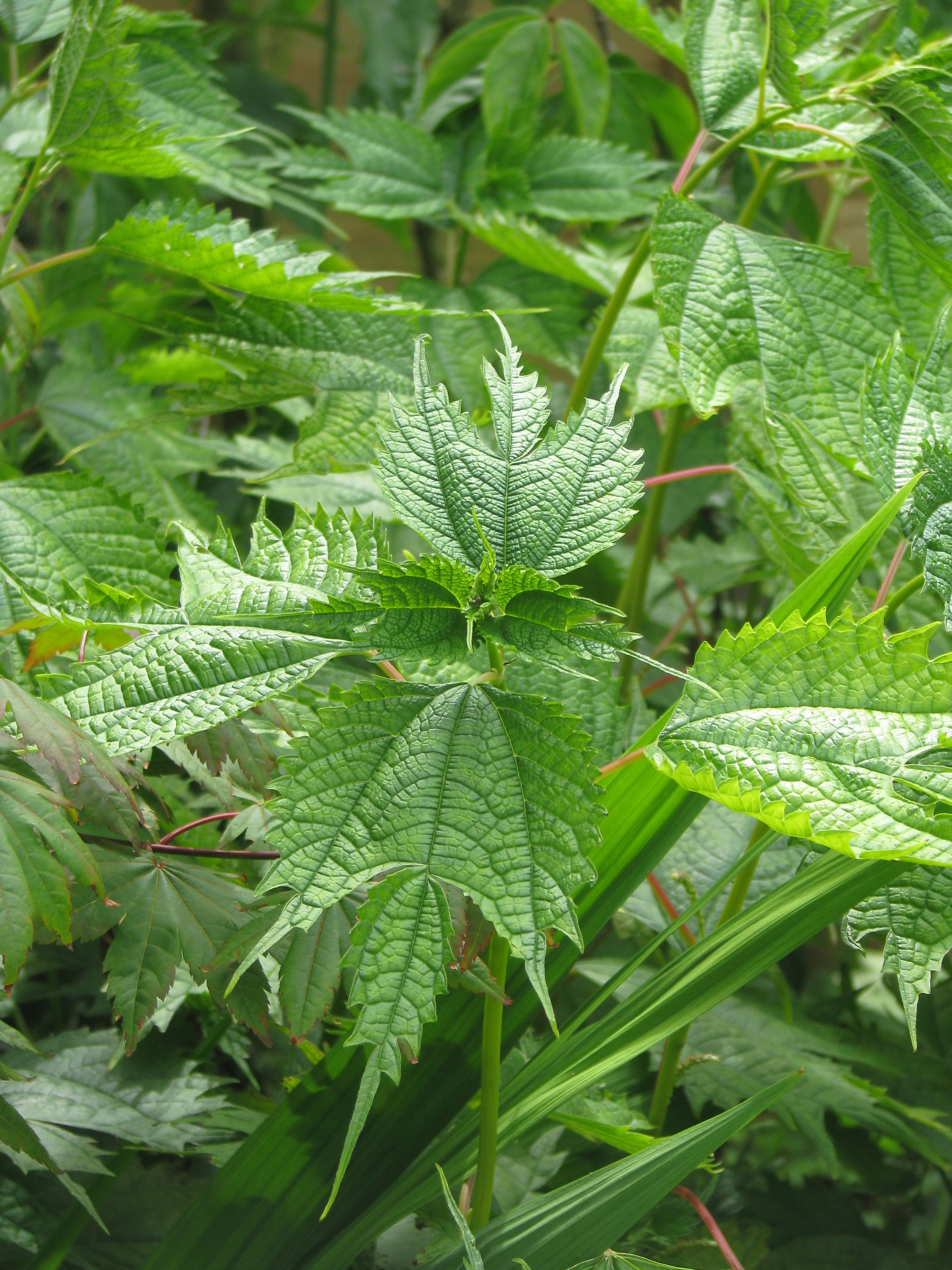
Variety silvestrii, showing three elongated teeth

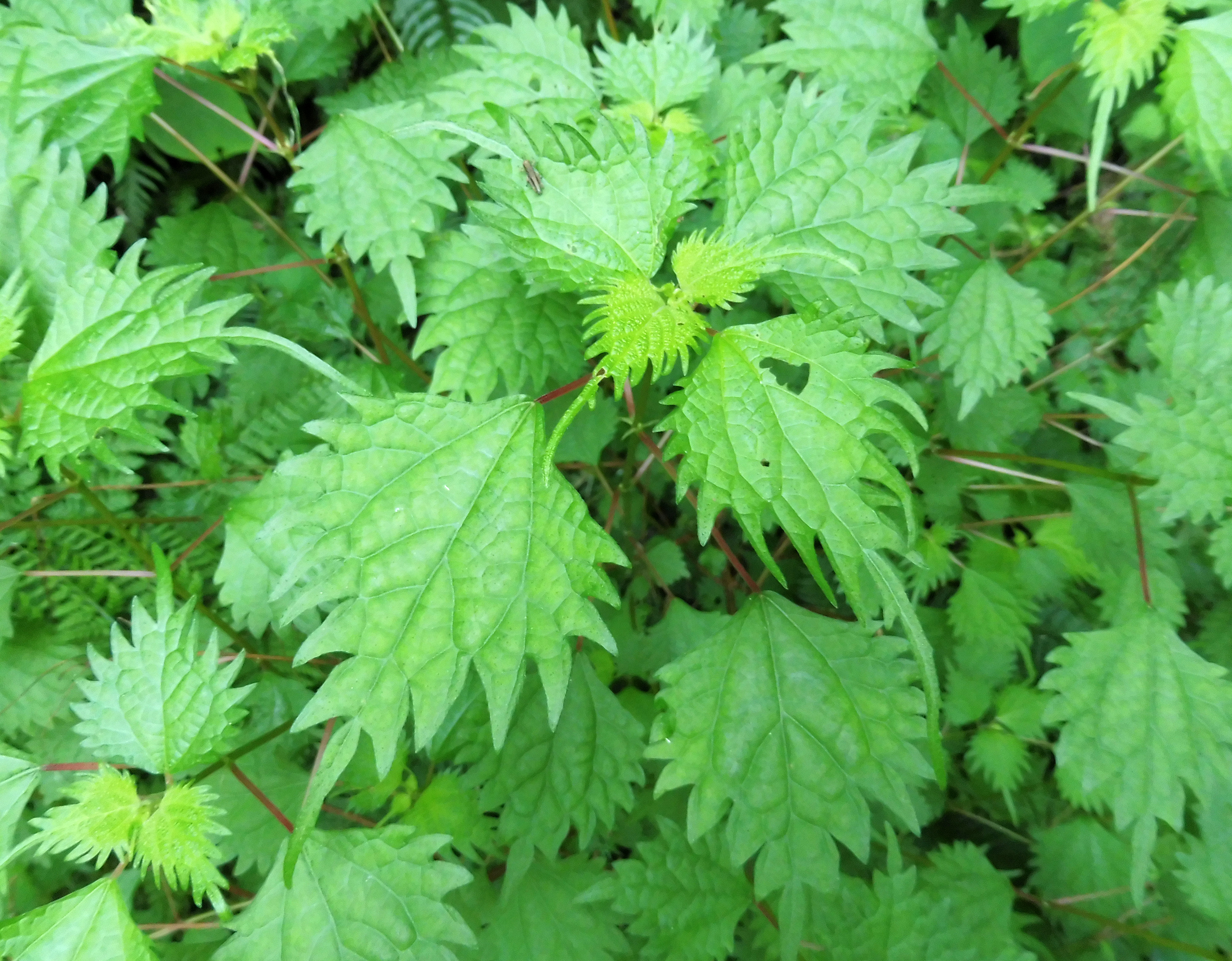
Variety tenera, showing glabrous leaves and a single elongated terminal tooth

== Taxonomy ==
Boehmeria japonica is a highly morphologically variable species across it range, due to the presence of both apomixis and polyploidy. Numerous segregates have named in attempts to taxonomically describe this variation. In the most recent treatment of the complex, three integrating varieties are recognized. They are:

- B. japonica var. japonica- with spreading pubescence, leaves larger and thicker-textured; found in warmer areas.
- B. japonica var. silvestrii -leaves glabrous or appressed-pubescent; leaves thin, wide, with three elongated teeth; uncommon.
- B. japonica var. tenera - leaves glabrous or appressed-pubescent; leaves thin, narrow, and with a single long terminal tooth; common.

== Uses ==
It is used for making ropes and cloth, as agricultural fodder, and medicinally to relieve fever.
