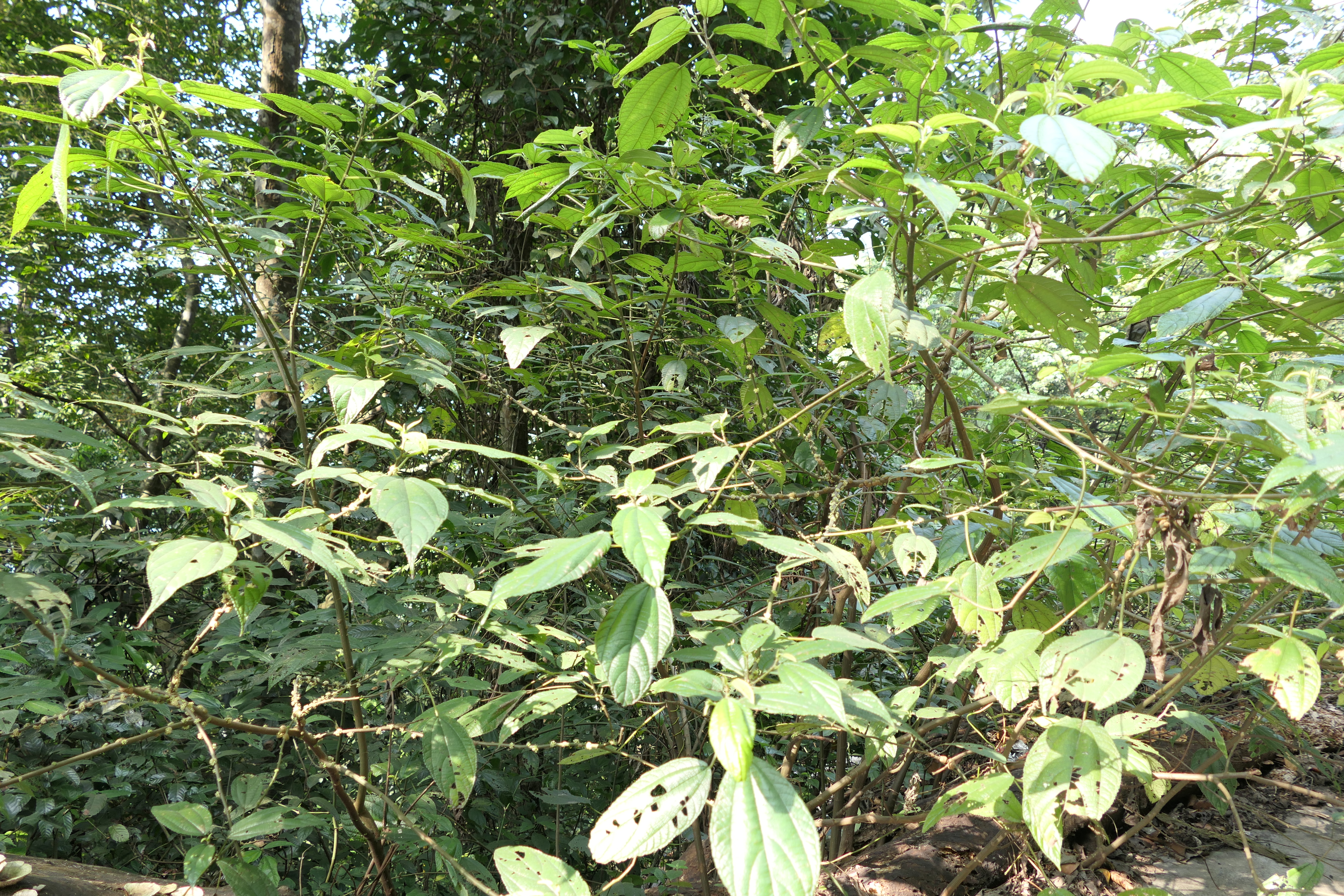

Scientific classification
- Kingdom: Plantae
- Clade: Tracheophytes
- Clade: Angiosperms
- Clade: Eudicots
- Clade: Rosids
- Order: Rosales
- Family: Urticaceae
- Genus: Boehmeria
- Species: B. depauperata

Binomial name
- Boehmeria depauperata Wedd.

Synonyms
- List: Boehmeria comosa var. neglecta (Blume) Wedd., nom. superfl.; Boehmeria cypholophoides Merr.; Boehmeria glomerulifera Miq.; Boehmeria glomerulifera var. leioclada W.T.Wang; Boehmeria klossii Ridl.; Boehmeria leiophylla W.T.Wang; Boehmeria malabarica Wedd., nom. superfl.; Boehmeria malabarica var. depauperata (Wedd.) Wedd., nom. superfl.; Boehmeria malabarica var. leioclada (W.T.Wang) W.T.Wang; Boehmeria malabarica var. neglecta J.J.Sm.; Boehmeria monticola Blume; Boehmeria neglecta Blume; Boehmeria oblongifolia W.T.Wang; Boehmeria ramiflora Bedd., nom. illeg.; Boehmeria subperforata Wedd.; Boehmeria travancarica Bedd.; Pipturus mindanaensis Elmer; Ramium malabaricum Kuntze, nom. superfl.; Ramium monticola (Blume) Kuntze; Urtica aquatica Moon, not validly publ.; Urtica malabarica Wall., nom. nud.; Urtica montana Korth. ex Blume, not validly publ.; Urtica myrapi Korth. ex Blume, not validly publ.; Urtica subperforata Wall. ex Wedd., not validly publ.

= Boehmeria depauperata =

Species of plant

Boehmeria depauperata, synonyms including Boehmeria glomerulifera and the illegitimate name Boehmeria malabarica, is a shrub or tree in the family Urticaceae, native to China (southern Yunnan and south-western Guangxi), Tibet, and tropical Asia. It is sometimes known as the Malabar tree nettle.

== Description ==
Boehmeria depauperata is a shrub or small tree growing 1–5 m in height.

== Distribution and habitat ==
Boehmeria depauperata is native to southeast and south-central China, Tibet and tropical Asia (the Andaman Islands, the Assam region, Bangladesh, Borneo, the eastern Himalayas, India, Java, Laos, Peninsular Malaysia, the Maluku Islands, Myanmar, Nepal, New Guinea, the Philippines, the Solomon Islands, Sri Lanka, Sulawesi, Sumatra, Thailand, and Vietnam). The species grows in undergrowth in subtropical evergreen and semi-evergreen forest up to elevations of 1400 m.
