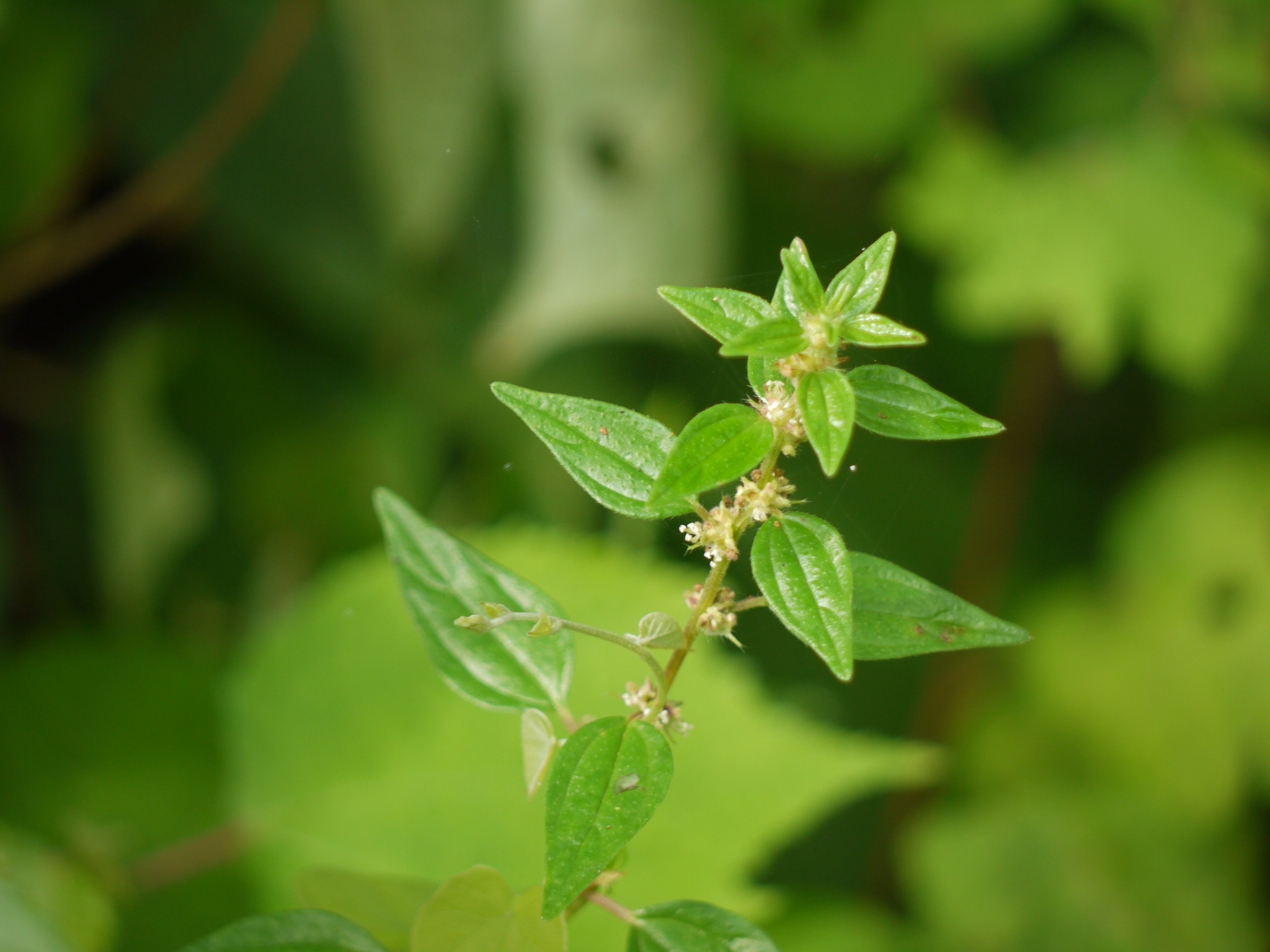

Scientific classification
- Kingdom: Plantae
- Clade: Tracheophytes
- Clade: Angiosperms
- Clade: Eudicots
- Clade: Rosids
- Order: Rosales
- Family: Urticaceae
- Genus: Pouzolzia
- Species: P. zeylanica

Binomial name
- Pouzolzia zeylanica (L.) Benn.

= Pouzolzia zeylanica =

Species of flowering plant

Pouzolzia zeylanica, commonly known as graceful Pouzolz's bush or Ceylon pouzolzia, is a perennial herb native to Tropical and Subtropical Asia and Northern Australia. This species, which grows primarily in seasonally dry tropical biomes, reaches a height of 12–40 cm and is characterized by its pale green flowers arranged in loose, hairy clusters in the leaf axils. The plant features lance-shaped to rhomboid-ovate leaves that can be opposite or rarely alternate, and its rootstock is often tuberous. The species has also been introduced to other regions, including Florida and El Salvador.
