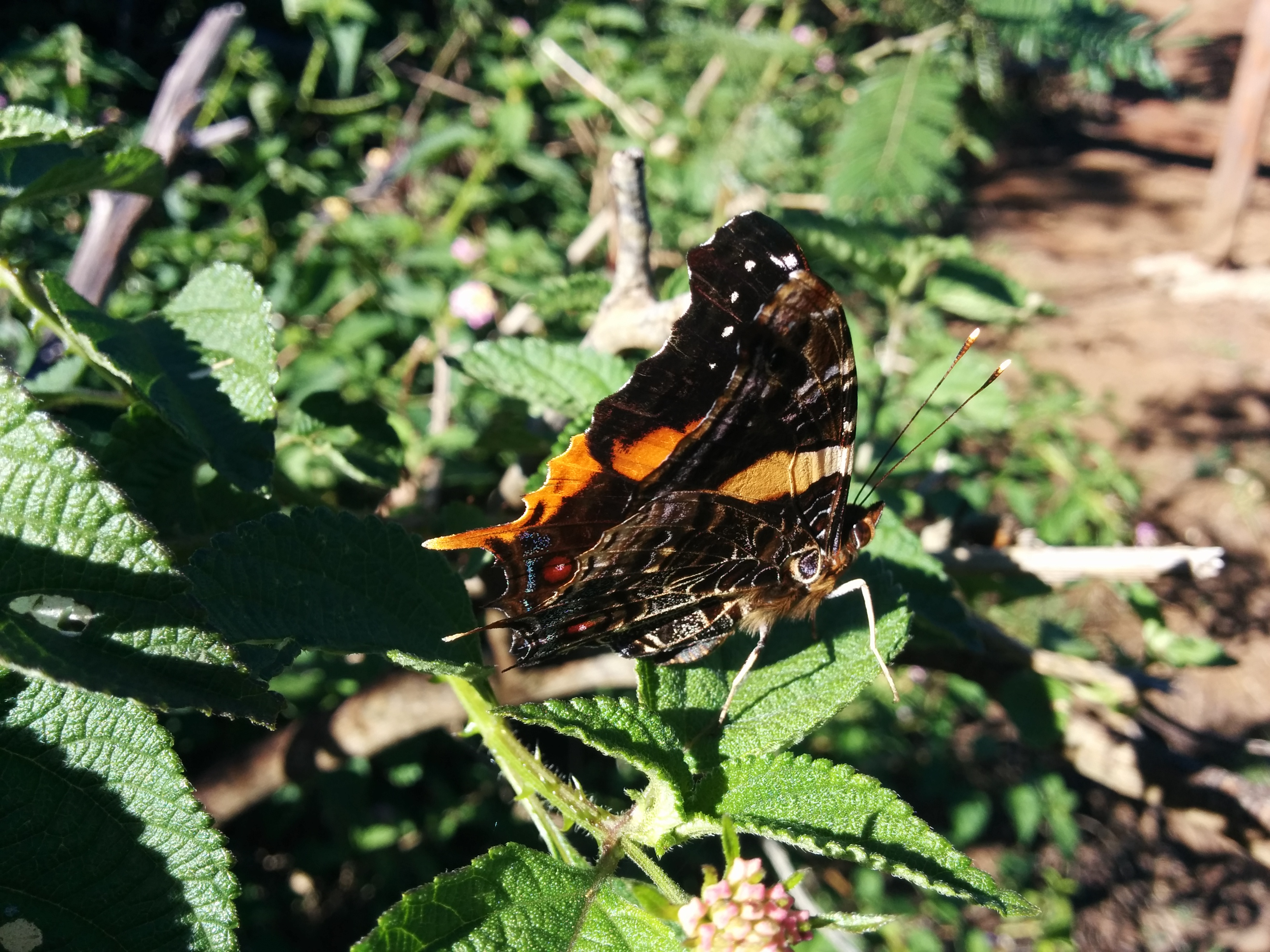

Scientific classification
- Domain: Eukaryota
- Kingdom: Animalia
- Phylum: Arthropoda
- Class: Insecta
- Order: Lepidoptera
- Family: Nymphalidae
- Genus: Antanartia
- Species: A. borbonica

Binomial name
- Antanartia borbonica (Oberthür, 1879)

Synonyms
- Vanessa borbonica Oberthür, 1879; Antanartia hippomene mauritiana Manders, 1908

= Antanartia borbonica =

Species of butterfly

Antanartia borbonica is a butterfly in the family Nymphalidae. It is found on Mauritius and La Réunion. Records for Madagascar are in error.

Adults are on wing from September to May but it is commonest in February and March.

The larvae feed on Pilea urticefolia.

== Subspecies ==
- Antanartia borbonica borbonica (Réunion)
- Antanartia borbonica mauritiana Manders, 1908 (Mauritius)
