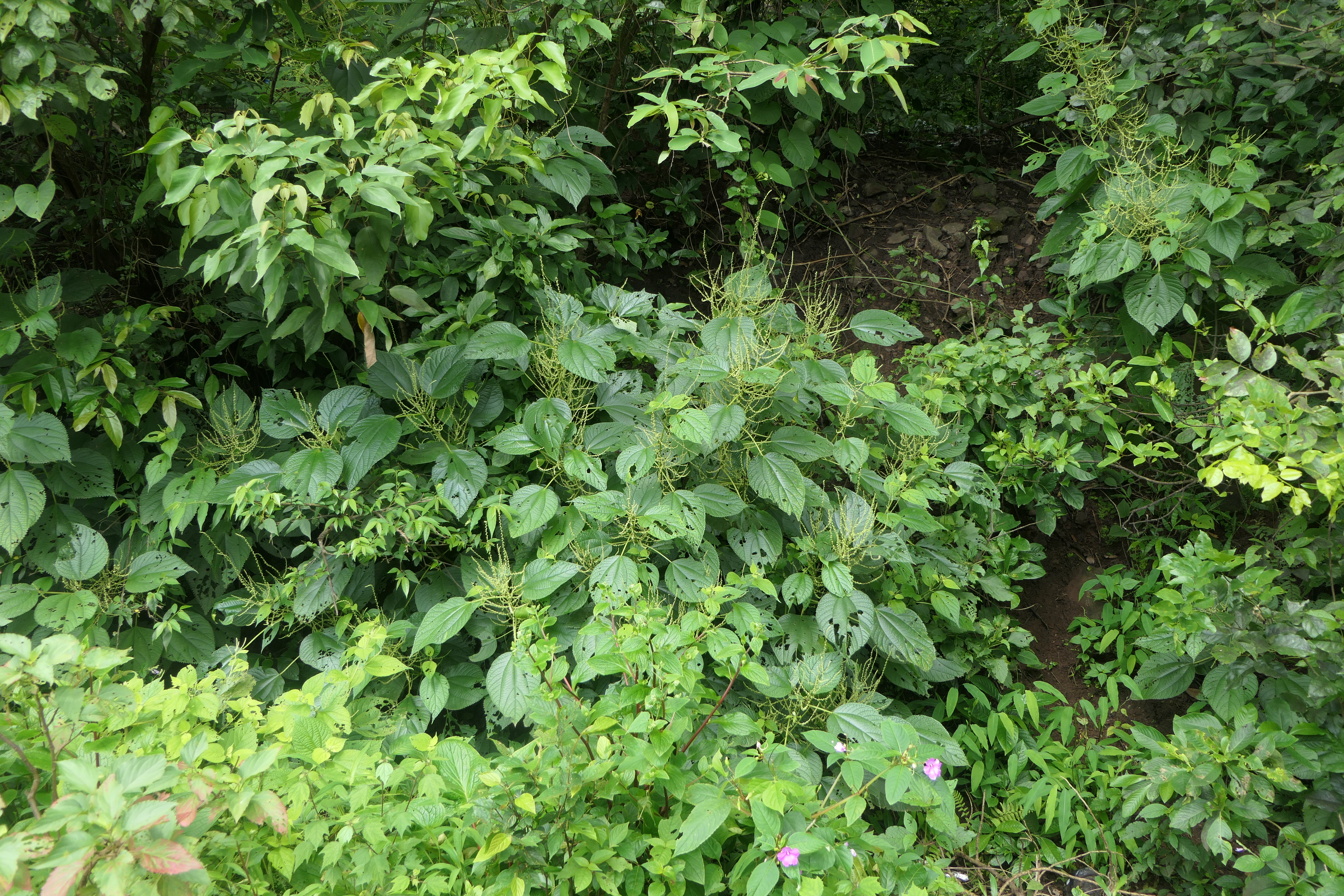

Scientific classification
- Kingdom: Plantae
- Clade: Tracheophytes
- Clade: Angiosperms
- Clade: Eudicots
- Clade: Rosids
- Order: Rosales
- Family: Urticaceae
- Genus: Boehmeria
- Species: B. virgata

Binomial name
- Boehmeria virgata (G.Forst.) Guill.

Synonyms
- Boehmeria platyphylla var. virgata (G.Forst.) Wedd.; Boehmeria taitensis Wedd., nom. superfl.; Urtica virgata G.Forst.

= Boehmeria virgata =

Species of plant

Boehmeria virgata is a species of flowering plant in the family Urticaceae, native to a wide area, from tropical Africa, the western Indian Ocean, tropical and subtropical Asia to Australia and the Pacific. It was first described by Georg Forster in 1786 as Urtica virgata.

== Subspecies and varieties ==
As of January 2024, Plants of the World Online accepted the following subspecies and varieties:

- Boehmeria virgata var. austroqueenslandica (Domin) Friis & Wilmot-Dear
- Boehmeria virgata var. canescens (Wedd.) Friis & Wilmot-Dear
- Boehmeria virgata var. densiglomerata (W.T.Wang) Friis & Wilmot-Dear
- Boehmeria virgata var. longissima (Hook.f.) Friis & Wilmot-Dear
- Boehmeria virgata subsp. macrophylla (Hornem.) Friis & Wilmot-Dear, syn. Boehmeria macrophylla
- Boehmeria virgata var. macrostachya (Wight) Friis & Wilmot-Dear, syn. Boehmeria platyphylla
- Boehmeria virgata var. maxima Friis & Wilmot-Dear
- Boehmeria virgata var. minuticymosa Acharya, Friis & Wilmot-Dear
- Boehmeria virgata var. rotundifolia (D.Don) Friis & Wilmot-Dear
- Boehmeria virgata var. scabrella (Dalzell & A.Gibson) Friis & Wilmot-Dear
- Boehmeria virgata var. strigosa (W.T.Wang) Friis & Wilmot-Dear
- Boehmeria virgata var. sumatrana (Miq.) Friis & Wilmot-Dear
- Boehmeria virgata var. tomentosa (Wedd.) Friis & Wilmot-Dear
- Boehmeria virgata var. velutina Friis & Wilmot-Dear
- Boehmeria virgata subsp. virgata
