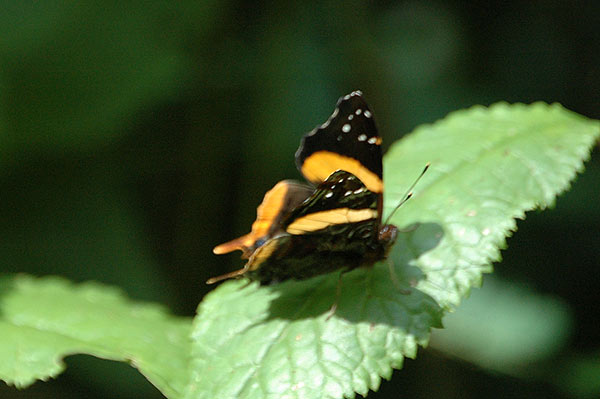
- A. schaeneia

Scientific classification
- Domain: Eukaryota
- Kingdom: Animalia
- Phylum: Arthropoda
- Class: Insecta
- Order: Lepidoptera
- Family: Nymphalidae
- Tribe: Nymphalini
- Genus: Antanartia; Rothschild & Jordan, 1903

= Antanartia =

Genus of butterflies

Antanartia, commonly called (African) admirals, is a genus in the family Nymphalidae found in southern Africa. They live along forest edges and are strongly attracted to rotting fruit and plant juices. For other admirals see genus, Vanessa. Recently, three species traditionally considered to be members of Antanartia have been moved to Vanessa based on molecular evidence. Antanartia borbonica was not sampled by the study, but was purported to belong in Antanartia based on morphological similarity.

== Species ==
The three species following Wahlberg et al., 2011, are:

- Antanartia borbonica (Oberthür, 1880)
- Antanartia delius (Drury, 1782) – orange admiral
- Antanartia schaeneia (Trimen, 1879) – long-tailed admiral

== Former species ==
- Antanartia abyssinica is now Vanessa abyssinica (Felder, 1867)
- Antanartia dimorphica is now Vanessa dimorphica (Howarth, 1966)
- Antanartia hippomene is now Vanessa hippomene (Hübner, 1823)
