= Arcte modesta =

Scientific classification
- Kingdom: Animalia
- Phylum: Arthropoda
- Clade: Pancrustacea
- Class: Insecta
- Order: Lepidoptera
- Superfamily: Noctuoidea
- Family: Erebidae
- Genus: Arcte
- Species: A. modesta

Binomial name
- Arcte modesta (van der Hoeven, 1840)

Synonyms
- Noctua modesta van der Hoeven, 1840; Arcte albimixta Warren, 1912; Arcte papuensis Warren, 1912; Arcte senica Felder, 1874; Cocytodes granulata Guenée, 1852; Cocytodes immodesta Guenée, 1852

Species of moth

Arcte modesta is a moth of the family Noctuidae.
