= Arcte taprobana =

Scientific classification
- Domain: Eukaryota
- Kingdom: Animalia
- Phylum: Arthropoda
- Class: Insecta
- Order: Lepidoptera
- Superfamily: Noctuoidea
- Family: Noctuidae
- Genus: Arcte
- Species: A. taprobana

Binomial name
- Arcte taprobana Moore, 1885

Species of moth

Arcte taprobana is a moth of the family Noctuidae. It is found in Sri Lanka.
