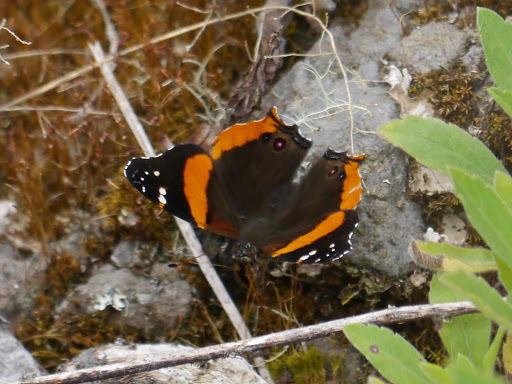

Scientific classification
- Domain: Eukaryota
- Kingdom: Animalia
- Phylum: Arthropoda
- Class: Insecta
- Order: Lepidoptera
- Family: Nymphalidae
- Genus: Vanessa
- Species: V. dimorphica

Binomial name
- Vanessa dimorphica (Howarth, 1966)

Synonyms
- Antanartia dimorphica Howarth, 1966

= Vanessa dimorphica =

Northern short-tailed admiral

Species of butterfly

Vanessa dimorphica (northern short-tailed admiral or dimorphic admiral) is a butterfly of the family Nymphalidae. It is found in Africa.

Wingspan is 45–45 mm in males and 42–48 mm in females. Has two or three flight periods with peak between April and May.

The larvae feed on Laportia peduncularis and Drogueria and Carduus species.

This species was traditionally considered to be a member of the genus Antanartia, but recent molecular analyses reveals that it is more closely related to members of the genus Vanessa.

== Subspecies ==
Listed alphabetically.

- V. d. aethiopica (Howarth, 1966) − (highlands of Ethiopia)
- V. d. comoroica (Howarth, 1966) – (Comoros)
- V. d. dimorphica (Howarth, 1966) – (Sudan, Ethiopia, Democratic Republic of the Congo, Uganda, Rwanda, Burundi, Kenya, Tanzania, Malawi, Zambia, eastern Zimbabwe, South Africa: Limpopo Province, Mpumalanga)
- V. d. mortoni (Howarth, 1966) – (eastern highlands of Nigeria, western Cameroon, Bioko)
