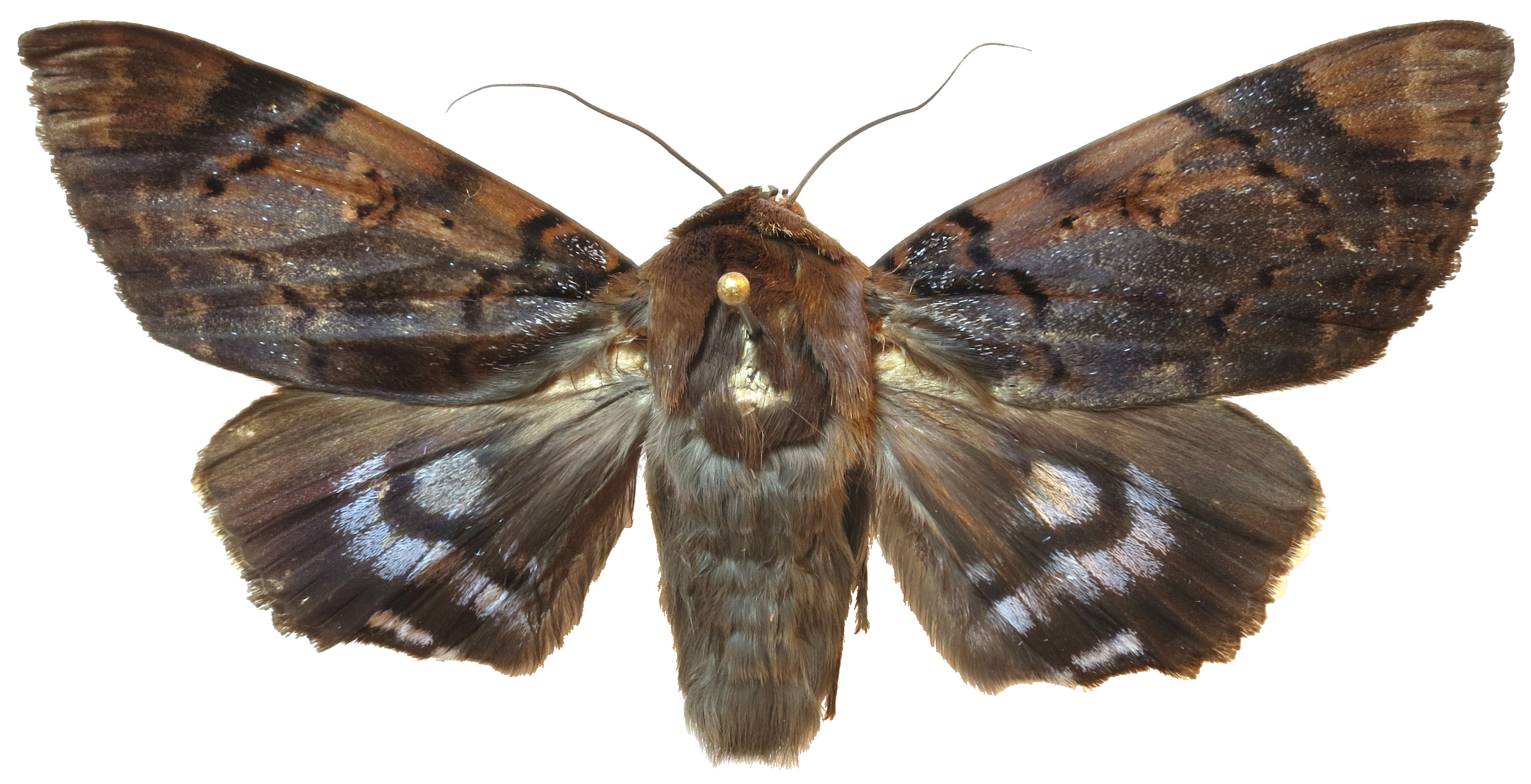
- Arcte coerula

Scientific classification
- Kingdom: Animalia
- Phylum: Arthropoda
- Clade: Pancrustacea
- Class: Insecta
- Order: Lepidoptera
- Superfamily: Noctuoidea
- Family: Noctuidae
- Genus: Arcte; Kollar, [1844]

Synonyms
- Cocytodes Guenée, 1852

= Arcte =

Genus of moths

Arcte is a genus of moths of the family Erebidae. The genus was erected by Vincenz Kollar in 1844.

== Description ==
Palpi upturned and reaching vertex of head, and short third joint. Antennae quite simple. Thorax and abdomen clothed with long hair. Abdomen in male with a strongly ridged chitinous rasp on center of dorsum of penultimate segment, probably played on by the strong chitinous spurs of the hindlegs. Tibia fringed with long hairs.

== Species ==
There are five species assigned to this genus:

- Arcte coerula (Guenée, 1852)
- Arcte modesta (van der Hoeven, 1840)
- Arcte nigrescens Butler, 1886
- Arcte polygrapha Kollar, 1844
- Arcte taprobana Moore, 1885
