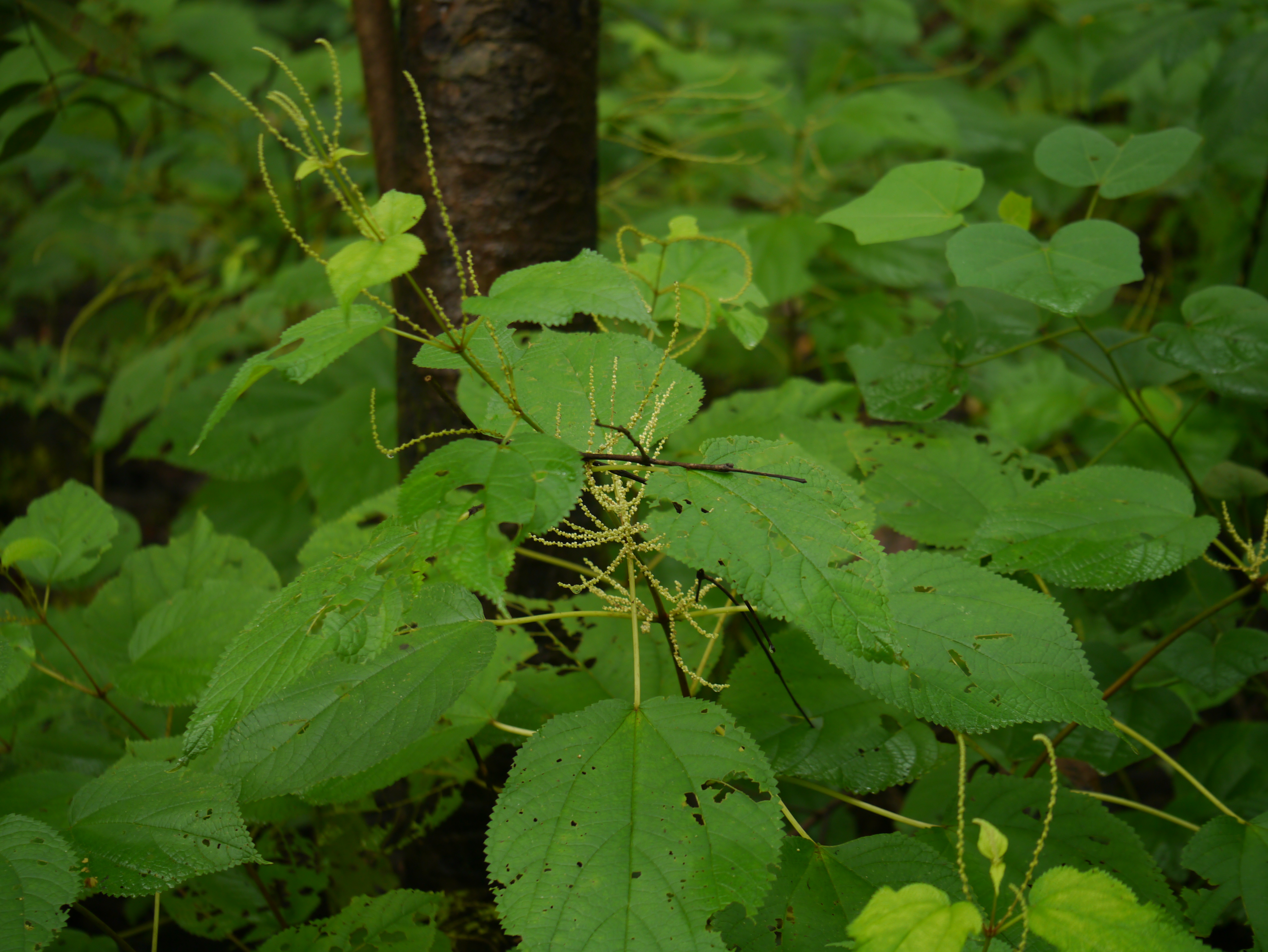

Scientific classification
- Kingdom: Plantae
- Clade: Embryophytes
- Clade: Tracheophytes
- Clade: Angiosperms
- Clade: Eudicots
- Clade: Rosids
- Order: Rosales
- Family: Urticaceae
- Genus: Boehmeria
- Species: B. virgata
- Subspecies: B. v. subsp. macrophylla

Trinomial name
- Boehmeria virgata subsp. macrophylla (Hornem.) Friis & Wilmot-Dear

Synonyms
- List: Boehmeria caudata Poir., nom. illeg.; Boehmeria elliptica Wedd.; Boehmeria elongata Steud., not validly publ.; Boehmeria interrupta Guill.; Boehmeria macrophylla Hornem.; Boehmeria massuriensis Blume; Boehmeria mauritiana var. luxurians Blume; Boehmeria mauritiana var. molliuscula Blume; Boehmeria mauritiana Wedd.; Boehmeria platyphylla subvar. elliptica (Wedd.) Wedd.; Boehmeria platyphylla var. angolensis Rendle; Boehmeria platyphylla var. nigeriana Wedd.; Boehmeria platyphylla var. oblonga Peter; Boehmeria platyphylla var. ugandensis Rendle; Boehmeria rugosissima Wedd., nom. illeg.; Boehmeria urantha Blume; Boehmeria virgata var. molliuscula (Blume) Friis & Wilmot-Dear; Procris macrophylla Reinw. ex Blume, not validly publ.; Ramium macrophyllum Kuntze; Urtica angustifolia Buch.-Ham. ex D.Don, not validly publ.; Urtica blanda Wall. ex Wedd., not validly publ.; Urtica caudata Poir., nom. illeg.; Urtica cinerascens Wall., not validly publ.; Urtica elongata J.F.Gmel.; Urtica grandifolia Thunb. ex Wedd., not validly publ.; Urtica macrostachya Wall. ex D.Don, not validly publ.; Urtica mollis Reinw. ex Blume, not validly publ.; Urtica platyphylla Buch.-Ham. ex D.Don, not validly publ.; Urtica pulcherrima Wall., nom. nud.; Urtica rugosa Reinw. ex Blume, not validly publ.; Urtica tomentosa Juss. ex Wedd., not validly publ.; Urtica uragera Steud., not validly publ.

= Boehmeria virgata subsp. macrophylla =

Species of flowering plant

Boehmeria virgata subsp. macrophylla is a subspecies of Boehmeria virgata, a flowering plant in the nettle family Urticaceae. This herbaceous plant perennial is native to tropical Africa and the western Indian Ocean. Some sources say that it is also native to China.

The flowers are dioecious or monoecious. Its flowering season is from June to September. It is commonly found in forests, thickets, along streams and roadsides. It is characterized by the opposite leaves, spike-like inflorescences, and fruiting perianths with a rounded base.

== Uses ==
The fibre of the stem is shiny, white and strong, and is used for making sacks, bags, rough clothes, nets, and rope. It is possibly useful for textiles. The woody parts are moderately hard but too small for woodworking; however they make a good fuel.
Boehmeria virgata subsp. macrophylla has some applications in traditional medicine, including as a tonic, for treating boils and for dermatitis. It is also used as an insecticide.
