= Boehmeria ramiflora =

Scientific classification
- Kingdom: Plantae
- Clade: Tracheophytes
- Clade: Angiosperms
- Clade: Eudicots
- Clade: Rosids
- Order: Rosales
- Family: Urticaceae
- Genus: Boehmeria
- Species: B. ramiflora

Binomial name
- Boehmeria ramiflora Jacq.

Synonyms
- List: Boehmeria cuspidata Wedd.; Boehmeria ehrenbergiana Urb.; Boehmeria jamaicensis Urb.; Boehmeria ramiflora var. cuspidata (Wedd.) Wedd.; Boehmeria ramiflora var. subvelutina Blume; Boehmeria ramiflora var. vinacea Steyerm.; Boehmeria rhynchophylla Wedd.; Caturus ramiflorus (Jacq.) L.; Procris ramiflora (Jacq.) Poir.; Ramium ramiflorum (Jacq.) Kuntze; Ramium rhynchophyllum (Wedd.) Kuntze

Species of flowering plant

Boehmeria ramiflora, synonyms including Boehmeria jamaicensis, is a species of plant in the family Urticaceae. It is native from Mexico through Central America and parts of the Caribbean to South America. It was first described by Nikolaus Joseph von Jacquin in 1760.

== Distribution ==
Boehmeria ramiflora is native to central and southern Mexico, much of Central America (Belize, Costa Rica, Guatemala, Honduras, Nicaragua and Panama), parts of the Caribbean (Dominican Republic, Haiti, Jamaica, the Leeward Islands and the Netherlands Antilles) and mainly northern and western South America (French Guiana, Suriname, Colombia, Ecuador and Peru) but also southern Brazil.

== Conservation ==
Boehmeria jamaicensis was assessed as "Lower Risk/near threatened" in 1998 in the IUCN Red List, where it is said to be native only to Jamaica. As of January 2024, B. jamaicensis was regarded as a synonym of Boehmeria ramiflora, which has a much wider distribution.
