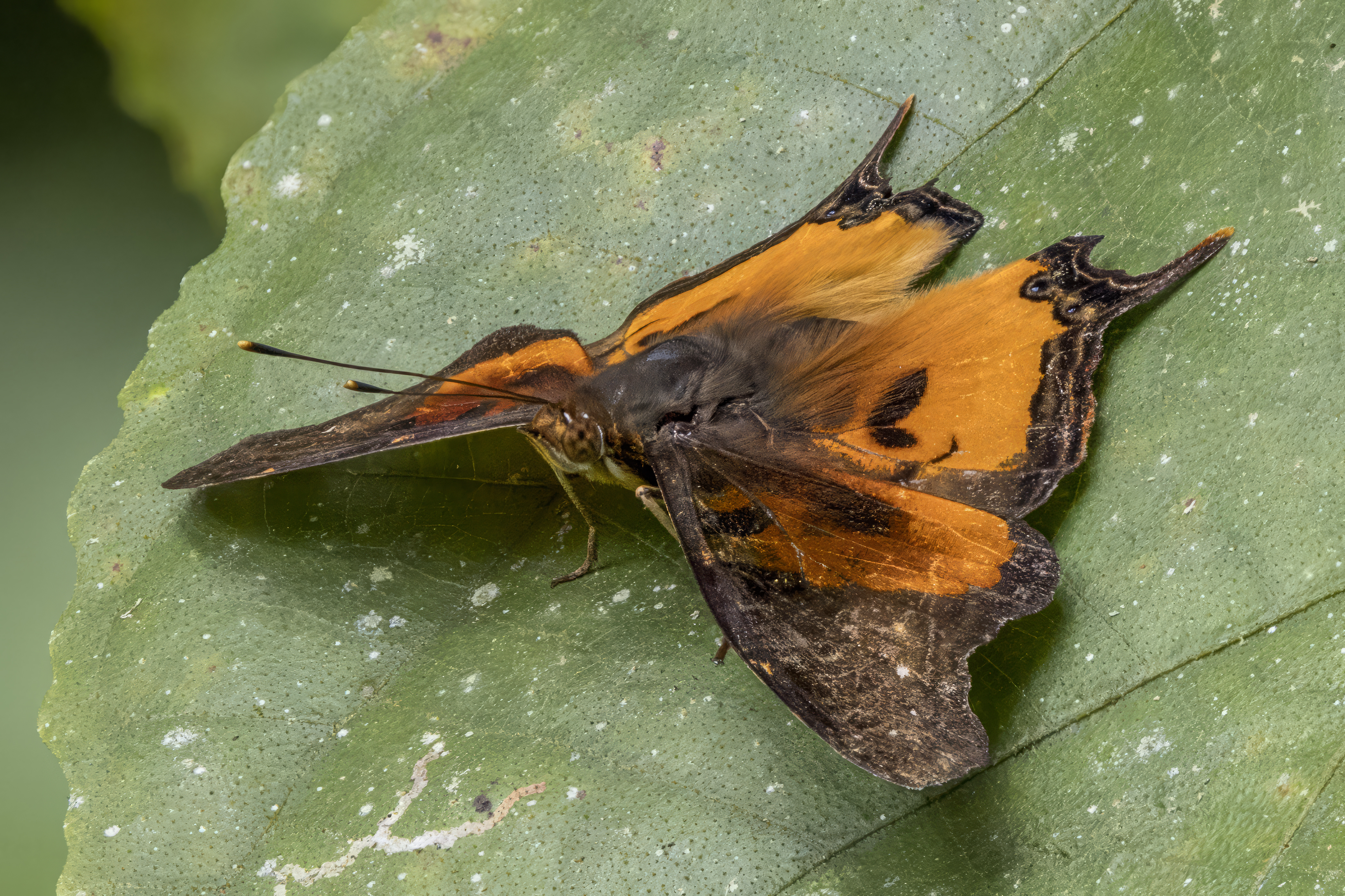

- both in Ghana

Scientific classification
- Kingdom: Animalia
- Phylum: Arthropoda
- Clade: Pancrustacea
- Class: Insecta
- Order: Lepidoptera
- Family: Nymphalidae
- Genus: Antanartia
- Species: A. delius

Binomial name
- Antanartia delius (Drury, 1782)

Synonyms
- Papilio delius Drury, 1782; Papilio eurocilia Fabricius, 1793; Vanessa demonica Godart, 1819; Antanartia amauroptera Sharpe, 1904; Hypanartia delius nigrescens Suffert, 1904; Antanartia delius f. kamitugensis Dufrane, 1945

= Antanartia delius =

Forest admiral

Species of butterfly

Antanartia delius, the forest admiral or orange admiral, is a butterfly in the family Nymphalidae. It is found in Senegal, Sierra Leone, Liberia, Ivory Coast, Ghana, Nigeria, Cameroon, Equatorial Guinea, the Republic of the Congo, Angola, the Democratic Republic of the Congo, Uganda, Kenya, and Tanzania. The habitat consists of lowland forests.

Both sexes are attracted to fermented fruit.

The larvae feed on Australina acuminata, Pouzolzia parasitica, Musanga and Urtica species.

== Description ==
Upperside. Antennae black. Thorax and abdomen red brown. Anterior wings nearly black at the base, and also half of them next the tips, whereon are five small white spots, the middle of them being of a dark orange. Posterior wings also black at the base; each of them is furnished with two tails, the outward ones the longest; the external edges being bordered with dark brown, almost black, and all the middle part of the wing is dark orange.

Underside. Palpi and legs yellowish. Breast dark brown. Abdomen yellowish. Wings with blackish and dark brown spots and marks, not to be distinctly described. Anterior wings with a broad yellowish bar crossing them from the anterior edges to the lower corners; while the posterior are also remarkable for a blueish patch placed between the outer tails and the abdominal corners. Wingspan nearly 2 1/2 inches (60 mm).

== Subspecies ==
- Antanartia delius delius (Senegal, Sierra Leone, Liberia, Ivory Coast, Ghana, Nigeria, Cameroon, Congo, Angola, Democratic Republic of the Congo, Uganda, western Kenya, western Tanzania)
- Antanartia delius guineensis Howarth, 1966 (Bioko)

Torben Larsen developed a species numbering system for his 2005 publication Butterflies of West Africa. The nominate subspecies is #789. The 'Larsen' numbers have since been used with permission in A Sharp Eye on Butterflies of Ghana.
