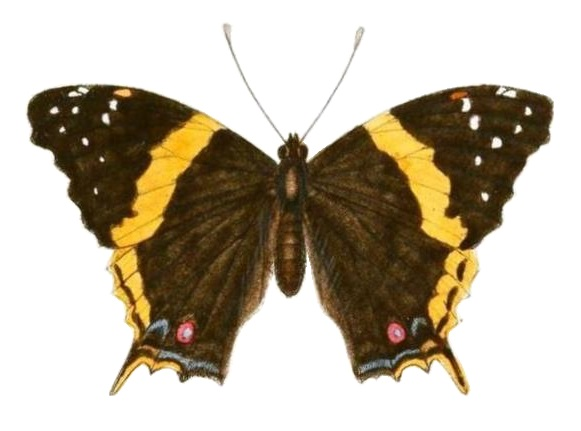

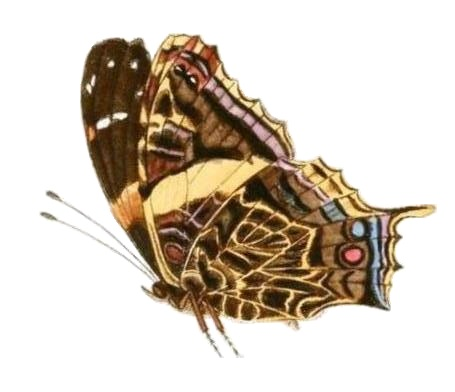
- Antanartia hippomene madegassorum, female upper and undersides

Scientific classification
- Domain: Eukaryota
- Kingdom: Animalia
- Phylum: Arthropoda
- Class: Insecta
- Order: Lepidoptera
- Family: Nymphalidae
- Genus: Vanessa
- Species: V. hippomene

Binomial name
- Vanessa hippomene (Hübner, [1823])

Synonyms
- Antanartia hippomene (Hübner, 1823); Hypanartia hippomene Hübner, [1823]; Antanartia hippomene f. milanion Stoneham, 1965; Hypanartia hippomene var. madegassorum Aurivillius, 1899

= Vanessa hippomene =

Southern short-tailed admiral

Species of butterfly

Vanessa hippomene, commonly known as the southern short-tailed admiral, is a butterfly of the family Nymphalidae which is native to South Africa and Madagascar.

Wingspan is 45–45 mm in males and 42–48 mm in females. Has two or three flight periods with peak between April and May.

This species was traditionally considered to be a member of the genus Antanartia, but recent molecular analyses reveals that it is more closely related to members of the genus Vanessa.

== Subspecies ==
- V. h. hippomene — Eswatini and South Africa: KwaZulu-Natal, Eastern Cape and southeastern Western Cape
- V. h. madegassorum (Aurivillius, 1899) — Madagascar: plateau
