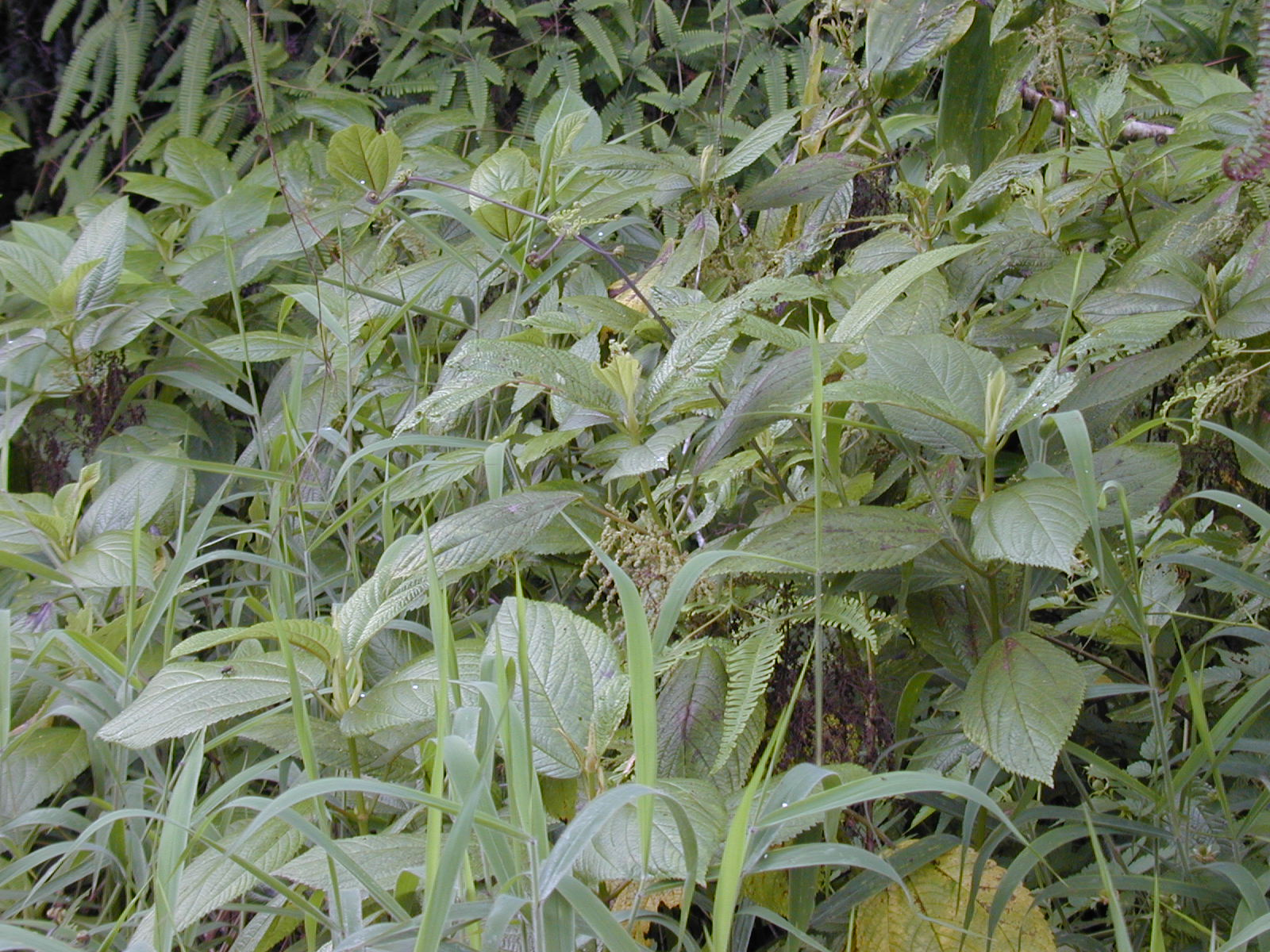
- Boehmeria grandis

Scientific classification
- Kingdom: Plantae
- Clade: Embryophytes
- Clade: Tracheophytes
- Clade: Spermatophytes
- Clade: Angiosperms
- Clade: Eudicots
- Clade: Rosids
- Order: Rosales
- Family: Urticaceae
- Tribe: Boehmerieae
- Genus: Boehmeria; Jacq.

Type species
- Boehmeria ramiflora Jacq. 1760

Species
- 47 species, see text

Synonyms
- Duretia Gaudich. 1830 nom. nud.; Ramium Kuntze 1891 nom. illeg.; Splitbergera Miq. 1840

= Boehmeria =

Genus of flowering plants

Boehmeria is a genus of 47 species of flowering plants in the nettle family Urticaceae. Of the species, 33 are indigenous to the Old World and 14 to the New World; no species is indigenous to both the Old and New Worlds. The species include herbaceous perennials, shrubs and small trees. Although related to the similar-looking species of the stinging nettles of genus Urtica, species of Boehmeria do not have stinging hairs. Because of the similarity in appearance, some species are commonly called "false nettles".

This genus is named in honour of the German botanist, Georg Rudolf Boehmer.

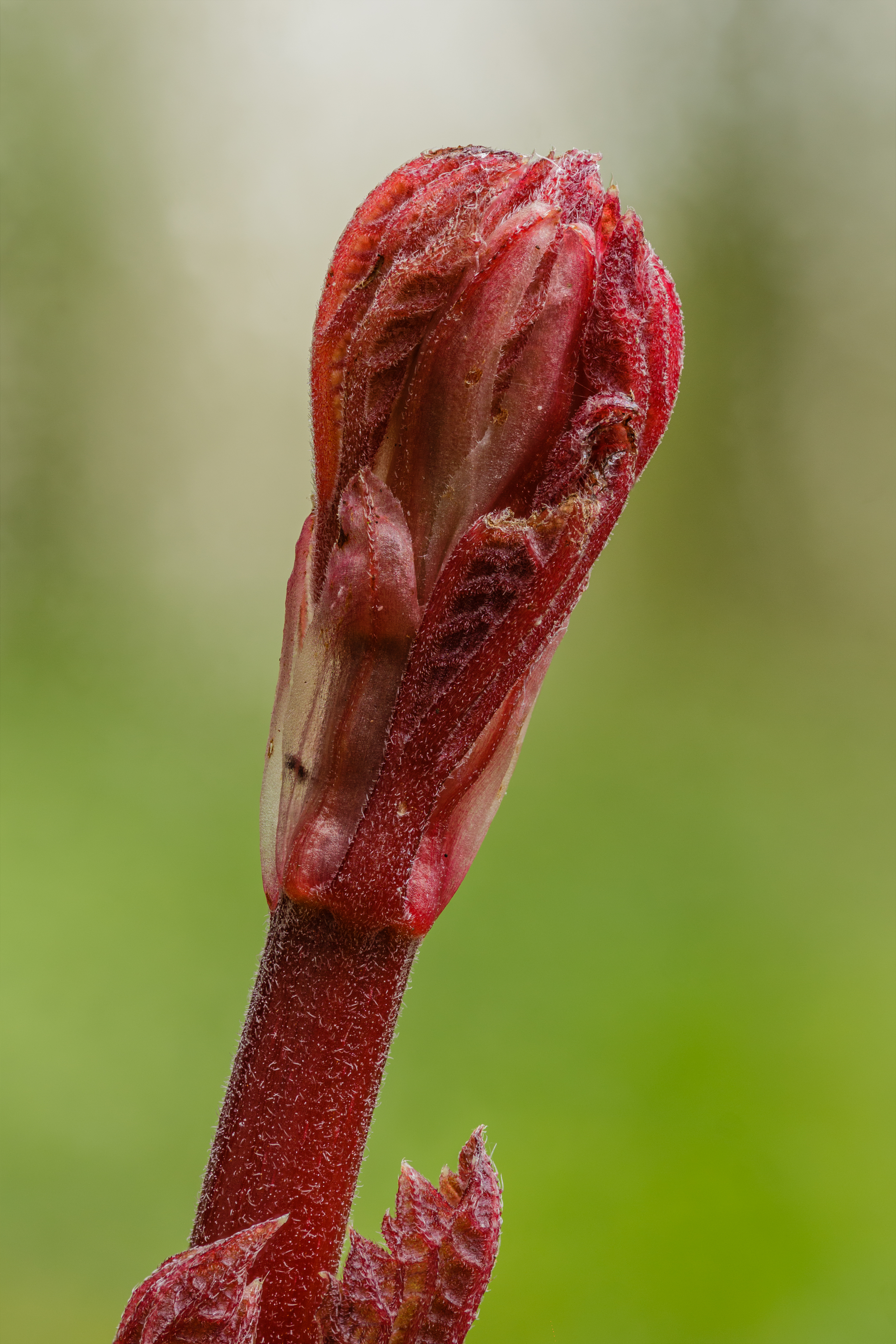
Red emerging young shoot of a Boehmeria nivea.

== Fossil record ==
14 fossil fruit of †Boehmeria sibirica have been extracted from borehole samples of the Middle Miocene fresh water deposits in Nowy Sacz Basin, West Carpathians, Poland.

== Cultivation and uses ==
One species, ramie (Boehmeria nivea) is an important fibre crop. Some are also used as ornamental plants.

Boehmeria species are used as food plants by the larvae of some Lepidoptera species including Bedellia boehmeriella, which feeds exclusively on B. grandis.

== Species ==
As of January 2024, Plants of the World Online accepted the species listed below.

=== New World species ===
The following species are found in the New World:

- Boehmeria aspera Wedd.
- Boehmeria balslevii Friis & Wilmot-Dear
- Boehmeria brevirostris Wedd.
- Boehmeria bullata Kunth
- Boehmeria burgeriana Wilmot-Dear, Friis & Kravtsova
- Boehmeria caudata Sw.
- Boehmeria celtidifolia Kunth
- Boehmeria cylindrica (L.) Sw.
- Boehmeria excelsa (Steud.) Wedd.
- Boehmeria pavonii Wedd.
- Boehmeria radiata Bürger
- Boehmeria ramiflora Jacq.
- Boehmeria repens (Griseb.) Wedd.
- Boehmeria spicigera Spreng.
- Boehmeria ulmifolia Wedd.

=== Old World species ===
The following species are found in the Old World:

- Boehmeria beyeri C.B.Rob.
- Boehmeria clidemioides Miq.
- Boehmeria conica C.J.Chen, Wilmot-Dear & Friis
- Boehmeria densiflora Hook. & Arn.
- Boehmeria depauperata Wedd.
- Boehmeria didymogyne Wedd.
- Boehmeria × dura Satake
- Boehmeria × egregia Satake
- Boehmeria grandis (Hook. & Arn.) A.Heller
- Boehmeria hamiltoniana Wedd.
- Boehmeria helferi Blume
- Boehmeria heterophylla Wedd.
- Boehmeria holosericea Blume
- Boehmeria japonica (L.f.) Miq.
- Boehmeria × kiusiana Satake
- Boehmeria kurzii Hook.f.
- Boehmeria lanceolata Ridl.
- Boehmeria leptostachya Friis & Wilmot-Dear
- Boehmeria listeri Friis & Wilmot-Dear
- Boehmeria manipurensis Friis & Wilmot-Dear
- Boehmeria meifenggensis S.S.Ying
- Boehmeria multiflora C.B.Rob.
- Boehmeria nakashimae Yahara
- Boehmeria nivea (L.) Gaudich.
- Boehmeria ourantha Miq.
- Boehmeria penduliflora Wedd. ex D.G.Long
- Boehmeria pilosiuscula (Blume) Hassk.
- Boehmeria platanifolia (Franch. & Sav.) C.H.Wright
- Boehmeria polystachya Wedd.
- Boehmeria rugosissima (Reinw. ex Blume) Miq.
- Boehmeria siamensis Craib
- Boehmeria sieboldiana Blume
- Boehmeria splitgerbera Koidz.
- Boehmeria subintegra Friis & Wilmot-Dear
- Boehmeria ternifolia D.Don
- Boehmeria tsaratananensis Leandri
- Boehmeria villosa C.B.Rob.
- Boehmeria virgata (G.Forst.) Guill.
- Boehmeria yaeyamensis Hatus.
- Boehmeria zollingeriana Wedd.

=== Synonyms ===
The following names have been synonymized:

- Boehmeria calophleba C.Moore & F.Muell. is a synonym of Pouzolzia australis (Endl.) Friis & Wilmot-Dear.
- Boehmeria glomerulifera Miq. is a synonym of Boehmeria depauperata Wedd..
- Boehmeria jamaicensis Urb. is a synonym of Boehmeria ramiflora Jacq..
- Boehmeria macrophylla Hornem. is a synonym of Boehmeria virgata subsp. macrophylla.
- Boehmeria platyphylla D.Don is a synonym of Boehmeria virgata var. macrostachya.
