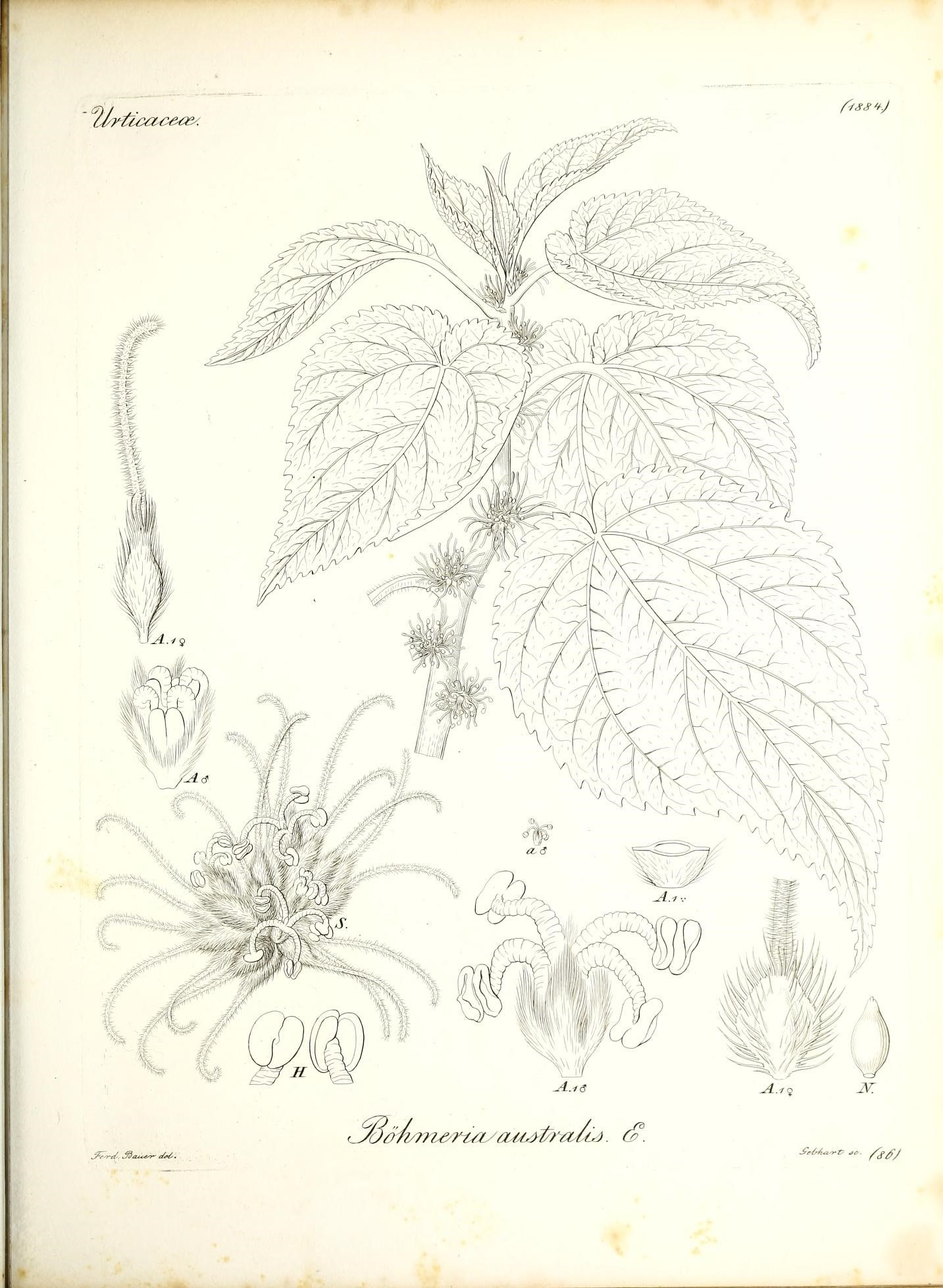

Scientific classification
- Kingdom: Plantae
- Clade: Tracheophytes
- Clade: Angiosperms
- Clade: Eudicots
- Clade: Rosids
- Order: Rosales
- Family: Urticaceae
- Genus: Pouzolzia
- Species: P. australis

Binomial name
- Pouzolzia australis (Endl.) Friis & Wilmot-Dear
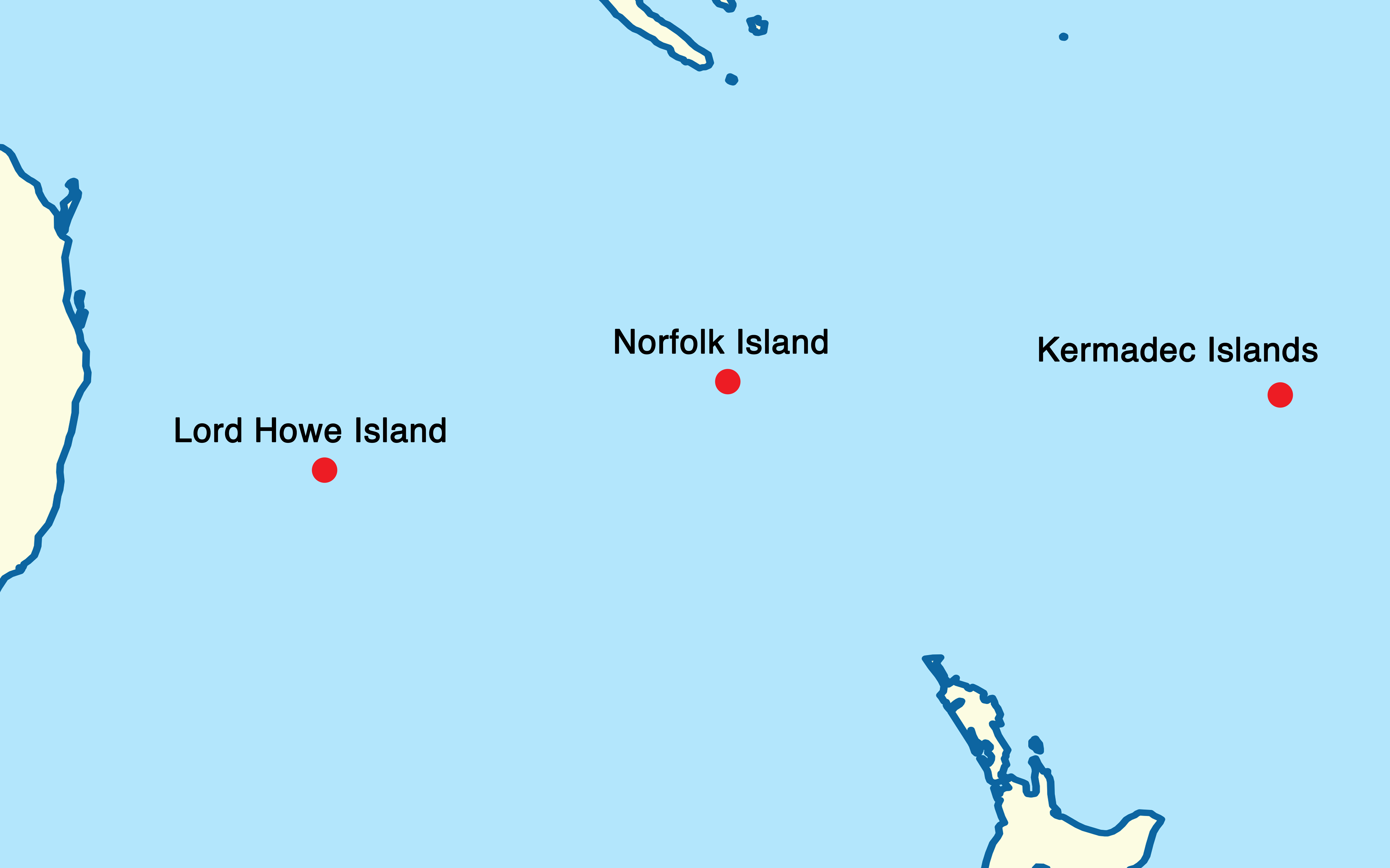
- Distribution in relation to Australia (left) and New Zealand (bottom right)

Synonyms
- Boehmeria australis Endl.; Boehmeria australis subsp. dealbata (Cheeseman) Sykes; Boehmeria australis var. dealbata (Cheeseman) Sykes; Boehmeria calophleba C.Moore & F.Muell.; Boehmeria dealbata Cheeseman; Procris splendens Lindl.; Ramium australe (Endl.) Kuntze; Ramium calophlebum (C.Moore & F.Muell.) Kuntze

= Pouzolzia australis =

Species of flowering plant

Pouzolzia australis, synonyms including Boehmeria australis and Boehmeria calophleba, is a species of large shrub or small tree in the plant family Urticaceae. It is endemic to small islands belonging to Australia and New Zealand – Norfolk Island, Lord Howe Island, and the Kermadec Islands. The population on Norfolk island, sometimes treated as a distinct subspecies, is critically endangered. In the Kermadec Islands, it was described in 2018 as "threatened – nationally endangered".

== Description ==
Pouzolzia australis is a shrub or small tree 1–8 m (3–26 ft) tall, densely branched and with a spreading crown. The leaves are alternate, typically 6–20 mm (0.2–0.8 in) long by 3–10 mm (0.1–0.4 in) wide, with a relatively long petiole. The leaves may be of two distinct sizes, with the larger leaves about 1.5 times as long as the smaller ones. The upper surface of the leaves is glabrous or with only scattered hairs, the lower surface has dense white or greyish tomentum, absent from the main veins and often even from smaller ones. Fine short hairs project through the tomentum. The inflorescences consist of axillary clusters up to 10 mm (0.4 in) across, each with a few or more than 50 small flowers; the clusters may be almost continuous along the stem. Each flower is either male or female; the clusters of flowers may have only one kind of flower or be mixed. Male flowers have parts in fours. Female flowers are larger, about 1.3–2 mm (0.05–0.08 in) long by 0.3–0.6 mm (0.01–0.02 in) wide. The style is 2–8 mm (0.1–0.3 in) long, persisting into fruiting. The fruits are flattened ovoids with a long beak, and marginal wings up to a third of the width of the fruit. The seeds are shiny light brown, easily detaching when mature.

Plants found on Lord Howe Island can be distinguished from those found on Norfolk Island. The former have relatively narrow leaves, about 3 times as long as wide with teeth often only 0.5 mm long, and shining white tomentum, and small flower clusters with at most 15 flowers. Norfolk Island plants have relatively broader leaves, about 2–2.6 times as long as wide with teeth usually at least 1.5 mm long, greyish tomentum, and larger flower clusters with usually over 50 flowers. Plants found on the Kermadec Islands tend to be intermediate, but more variable.

== Taxonomy ==
Three taxa were initially described in the genus Boehmeria, one for each of the three distinct groups of islands (Norfolk Island, the Kermadec Islands and Lord Howe Island):

- Plants found on Norfolk Island were first described in 1833 by Stephan Endlicher as Boehmeria australis. The taxon automatically became Boehmeria australis subsp. australis when another subspecies of B. australis was created in 2005.
- Plants found in the Kermadec Islands were first described in 1892 by Thomas Cheeseman as Boehmeria dealbata. The taxon was reduced to the subspecies B. australis subsp. dealbata in 2005, after previously being treated as var. dealbata.
- Plants found on Lord Howe Island were first described in 1872 as Boehmeria calophleba.

In 2006, all three taxa were transferred to the genus Pouzolzia as Pouzolzia australis, with no infrataxa being recognized. The transfer to Pouzolzia was mainly supported by characters of the fruit, which is shiny, readily detached from the persistent perianth, and has a wing formed by thickening of the perianth. The forms found on the three separated islands or groups of islands differ, with those on Norfolk Island and Lord Howe Island most distinct, and those on the Kermadec Islands intermediate, and also most variable, which suggests that the species may have originated there and spread to the other two locations. The three forms have been described as "clearly only variants of the same taxon".

As of January 2024, the treatment as the single species Pouzolzia australis was accepted by Plants of the World Online. As of January 2024, an online publication from the New Zealand Plant Conservation Network accepted both the placement in Pouzolzia and sinking B. australis subsp. australis and B. australis subsp. dealbata into P. australis, but suggested more work is needed to confirm the inclusion of B. calophleba.

== Distribution and conservation ==
In 2003, only about 33 mature plants were known from Norfolk Island, where it is regarded as "critically endangered". Plants grow rapidly and have a short lifespan. In the Kermadec Islands, it is now known only from Raoul Island and Macauley Island, and in 2018 was described as "threatened – nationally endangered". On Lord Howe Island, the species is generally uncommon, but is locally abundant in the moist forests of the southern parts of the island, where it forms an association with Piper species on the north-western slopes of Mount Lidgbird.
