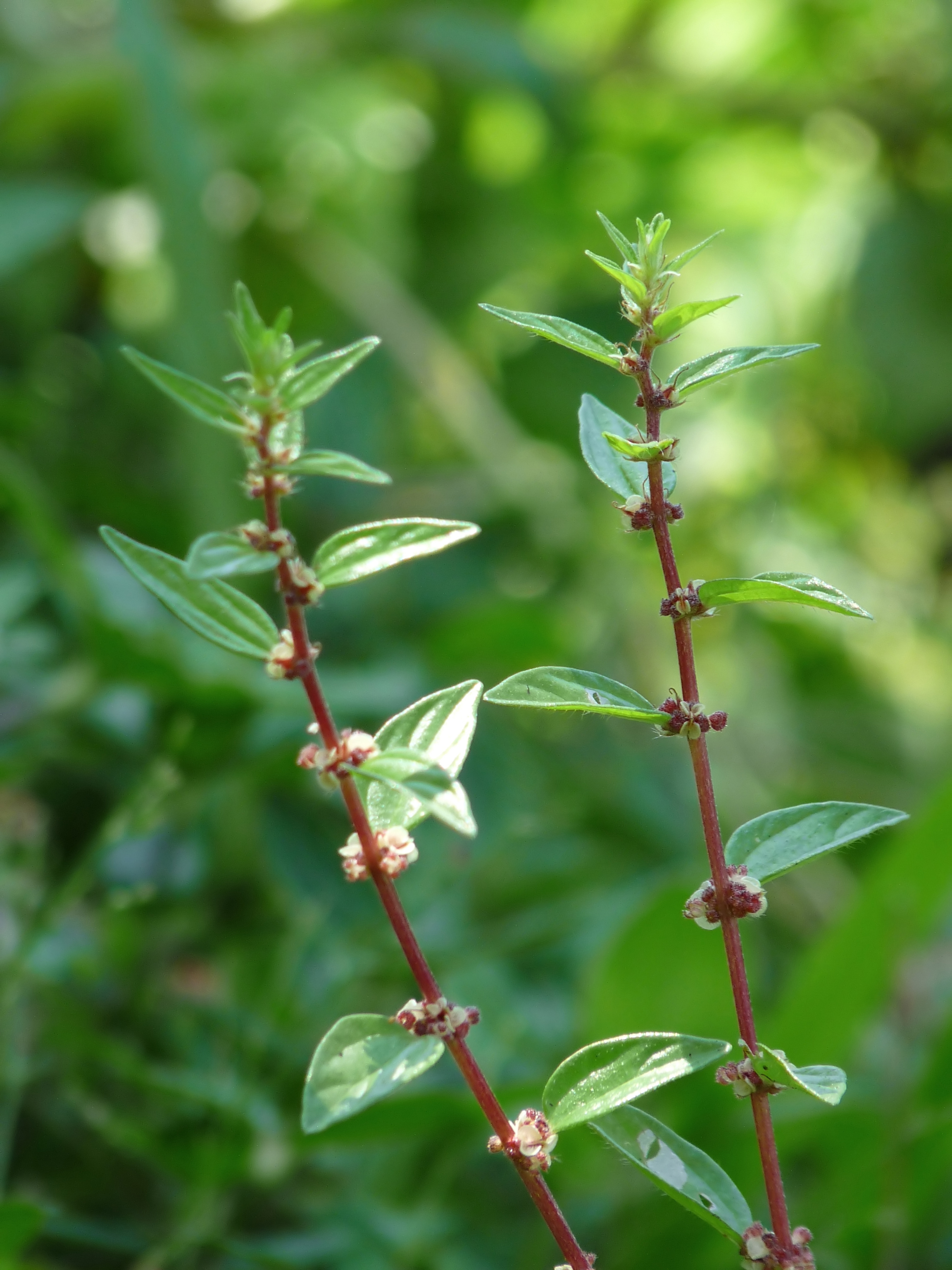
- Pouzolzia zeylanica

Scientific classification
- Kingdom: Plantae
- Clade: Tracheophytes
- Clade: Angiosperms
- Clade: Eudicots
- Clade: Rosids
- Order: Rosales
- Family: Urticaceae
- Tribe: Boehmerieae
- Genus: Pouzolzia; Gaudich. 1830

Type species
- Pouzolzia laevigata (Poir.) Gaudich. 1830

Species
- 35, see text

Synonyms
- Goetharthia Herzog 1915; Hyrtanandra Miq. 1851; Leucococcus Liebmann 1851; Margarocarpus Wedd. 1848

= Pouzolzia =

Genus of flowering plants

Pouzolzia is a genus of flowering plants in the nettle family. There are about 35 species distributed throughout the tropical world. Most are shrubs, and some are herbs. The genus was named for French botanist and plant collector Pierre Marie Casimir de Pouzolz (1785–1858).

Pouzolzia hirta is used as a medicinal herb, as well as for culinary purposes, in various African and Asian countries.

People from Tagin tribe of the state of Arunachal Pradesh in India use Poulzolozia hirta, known as "Oyik" in the local language, as a part of a main food course which is consumed along with rice. Oyik is prepared with smoked beef/Gayal meat (Bos frontalis) or pork, along with dried bamboo shoots, and served at various occasions and festivals.

== Selected species ==
The following species are included:

=== Section Pouzolzia Gaudich. 1830 ===
==== New World Species ====
The following species are found in the New World:

- Pouzolzia formicaria (Wedd.) Wedd. 1857
- Pouzolzia guatemalana (Blume) Wedd. 1869
  - var. guatemalana (Blume) Wedd. 1869
  - var. nivea (S. Watson) Friis & Wilmot-Dear 1996
- Pouzolzia laevis (Wedd.) Wedd. 1869
- Pouzolzia latistipula Friis & Wilmot-Dear 1996
- Pouzolzia longipes Killip 1937
- Pouzolzia nudiflora (Willd.) Friis & Wilmot-Dear 1996
- Pouzolzia obliqua (Wedd.) Wedd. 1857
- Pouzolzia occidentalis (Liebm.) Wedd. 1857
  - var. occidentalis (Liebm.) Wedd. 1857
  - var. palmeri (Liebm.) Friis & Wilmot-Dear 1996
- Pouzolzia parasitica (Forssk.) Schweinf. 1896
- Pouzolzia poeppigiana (Wedd.) Killip 1937
- Pouzolzia pringlei Greenm. 1898
- Pouzolzia purpusii Brandegee 1924
- Pouzolzia scaberrima Killip 1934
- Pouzolzia zeylanica (L.) Benn. 1838

==== Old World Species ====
The following species are found in the Old World:

- Pouzolzia arachnoidea (Walp.) Wedd. 1869
- Pouzolzia australis (Endl.) Friis & Wilmot-Dear 2004
- Pouzolzia boiviniana (Blume) Wedd. 1857
- Pouzolzia cymosa Wight 1853
- Pouzolzia denudata De Wild. & Th. Dur. 1900
- Pouzolzia fadenii Friis & Jellis 1984
- Pouzolzia gaudichaudii Leandri 1951
- Pouzolzia guineensis Benth. 1849
- Pouzolzia herpetophyton Friis & Wilmot-Dear 2004
- Pouzolzia laevigata (Poir.) Gaudich. 1830
- Pouzolzia mandrarensis Leandri 1951
- Pouzolzia mixta Solms 1864
  - var. mixta Solms 1864
  - var. shirensis (Rendle) Friis & Wilmot-Dear 2004
- Pouzolzia niveotomentosa W. T. Wang 1981
- Pouzolzia parasitica (Forssk.) Schweinf. 1896
- Pouzolzia rubricaulis (Blume) Wedd. 1869
- Pouzolzia sanguinea (Blume) Merrill 1921
  - var. cinerascens (Blume) Friis & Wilmot-Dear 2004
  - var. formosana (Li) Friis & Wilmot-Dear 2004
  - var. fulgens (Wedd.) Hara 1975
  - var. sanguinea (Blume) Merrill 1921
- Pouzolzia thailandica Friis & Wilmot-Dear 2004
- Pouzolzia tsaratananensis Friis & Wilmot-Dear 2004
- Pouzolzia variifolia Friis & Wilmot-Dear 2004
- Pouzolzia weddellii Leandri 1951
- Pouzolzia zeylanica (L.) Benn. & R. Br. 1838
  - var. calcicola Friis & Wilmot-Dear 2004
  - var. zeylanica (L.) Benn. & R. Br. 1838
- Pouzolzia friisii A.Gupta & V.Wagh, 2024

=== Section Memorialis Benn. & R. Br. 1838 ===
- Pouzolzia hirta (Blume) Hassk. 1844
  - var. hirta (Blume) Hassk. 1844
  - var. parvifolia (Wight) Friis & Wilmot-Dear 2004
- Pouzolzia pentandra (Roxb.) Benn. & R. Br. 1838
  - subsp. pentandra (Roxb.) Benn. & R. Br. 1838
  - subsp. wightii (Benn. & R. Br.) Friis & Wilmot-Dear 2004
    - var. gracilis (Miq.) Friis & Wilmot-Dear 2004
    - var. wightii (Benn. & R. Br.) Friis & Wilmot-Dear 2004
- Pouzolzia peteri Friis 1987

=== Incertae sedis ===
- Pouzolzia floresiana Friis & Wilmot-Dear 2012
- Pouzolzia rugulosa (Wedd.) Acharya & Kravtsova 2009
