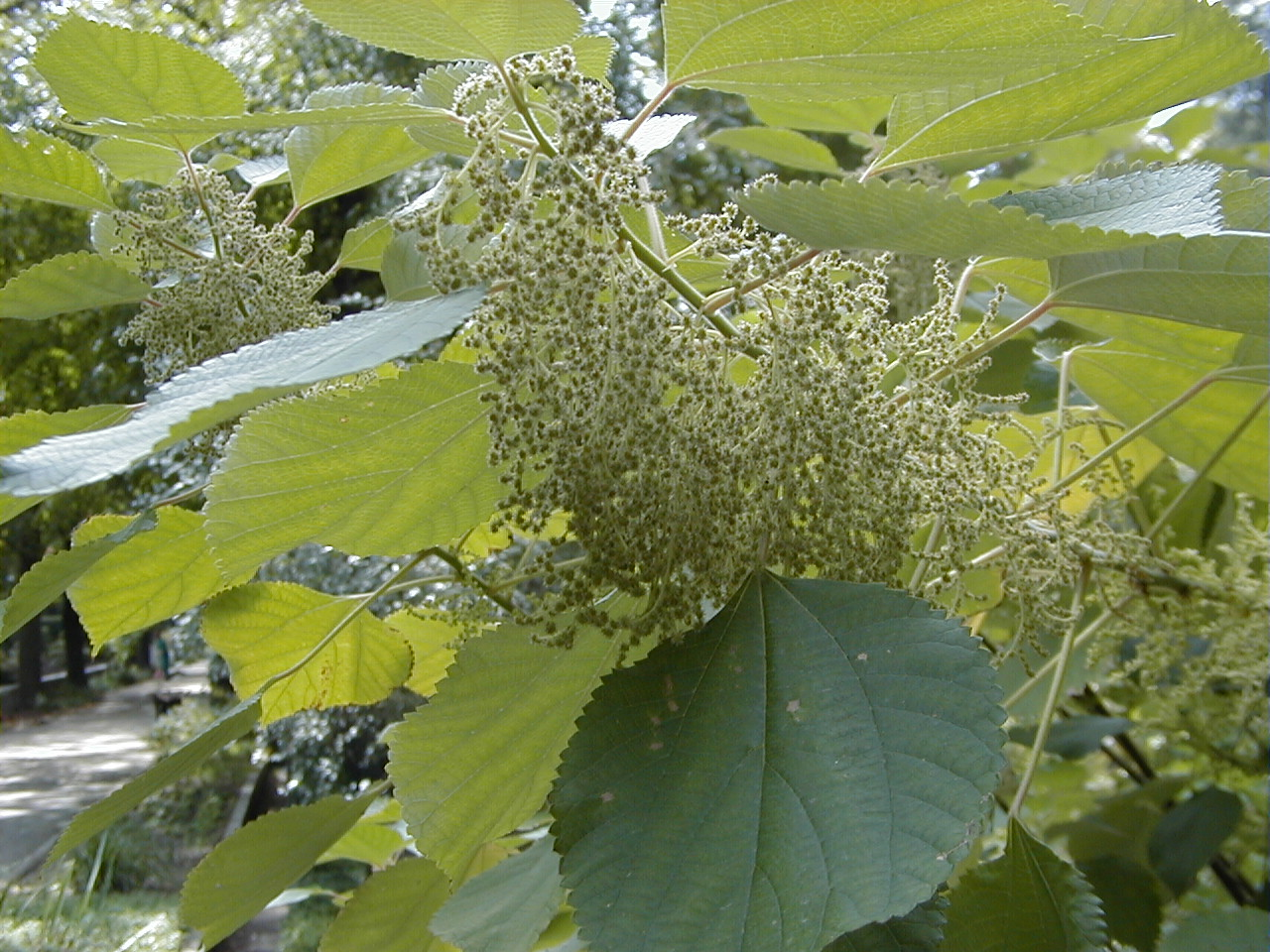

Scientific classification
- Kingdom: Plantae
- Clade: Embryophytes
- Clade: Tracheophytes
- Clade: Angiosperms
- Clade: Eudicots
- Clade: Rosids
- Order: Rosales
- Family: Urticaceae
- Genus: Boehmeria
- Species: B. nivea

Binomial name
- Boehmeria nivea (L.) Gaudich

Synonyms
- List: Boehmeria candicans Hassk.; Boehmeria compacta Blume; Boehmeria frutescens var. concolor (Makino) Nakai; Boehmeria frutescens var. viridula (Yamam.) Suzuki; Boehmeria juncea Bedevian; Boehmeria mollicoma Miq.; Boehmeria nipononivea Koidz.; Boehmeria nipononivea var. concolor (Makino) Ohwi; Boehmeria nivea var. candicans (Hassk.) Wedd.; Boehmeria nivea f. concolor (Makino) Kitam.; Boehmeria nivea var. concolor Makino; Boehmeria nivea f. nipononivea (Koidz.) Kitam.; Boehmeria nivea subsp. nipononivea (Koidz.) Kitam.; Boehmeria nivea var. nipononivea (Koidz.) W.T.Wang; Boehmeria nivea var. reticulata Blume; Boehmeria nivea var. tenacissima (Roxb.) Miq.; Boehmeria nivea f. viridula (Yamam.) Hatus.; Boehmeria nivea var. viridula Yamam.; Boehmeria tenacissima (Roxb.) Ed.Otto; Boehmeria thailandica Yahara; Boehmeria utilis André; Procris nivea Wedd.; Ramium compactum (Blume) Kuntze; Ramium mollicoma (Miq.) Kuntze; Ramium niveum (L.) Kuntze; Urera lamiifolia Gaudich. ex B.D.Jacks.; Urtica candicans Blume; Urtica lamiifolia Juss. ex Pers.; Urtica millettii Hook. & Arn.; Urtica nivea L.; Urtica tenacissima Roxb.; Urtica utilis de Vriese

= Boehmeria nivea =

Species of plant

Boehmeria nivea, commonly known as ramie, Chinese grass or Chinese silk plant, is a monoecious shrub or subshrub in the family Urticaceae commonly found in China. It is native to warm temperate and tropical regions of the eastern Himalaya, and east and southeastern Asia. It grows to 2 metres tall, with alternately-arranged leaves 7–15 cm long and 6–12 cm broad, oval-acuminate with a serrated margin. Boehmeria nivea has been cultivated in China and elsewhere in southeast Asia for thousands of years, as the source of the fibre crop ramie. It has been introduced into tropical and subtropical parts of other continents, such the southeastern United States.

== Taxonomy ==
Boehmeria nivea was first described by Carl Linnaeus in 1753 as Urtica nivea. In 1830, Charles Gaudichaud-Beaupré transferred it to the genus Boehmeria, which had been established by Nikolaus Joseph von Jacquin in 1760. The species has acquired a substantial number of synonyms, most in the genera Boehmeria and Urtica. Some varieties have been proposed but are not accepted: Boehmeria nivea var. tenacissima and Boehmeria nivea var. strigosa.
