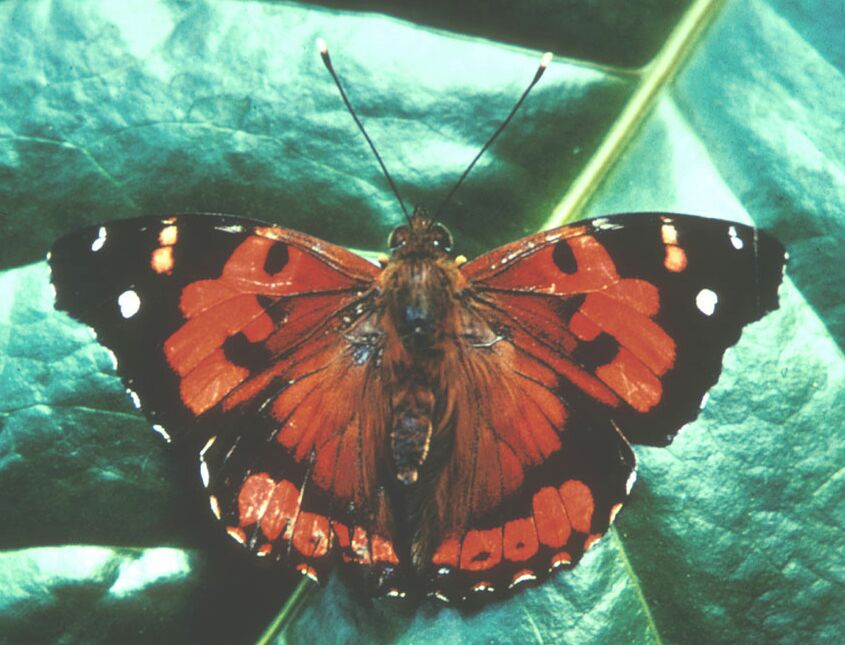

Conservation status
- Vulnerable (IUCN 3.1)

- Vulnerable (NatureServe)

Scientific classification
- Kingdom: Animalia
- Phylum: Arthropoda
- Class: Insecta
- Order: Lepidoptera
- Family: Nymphalidae
- Genus: Vanessa
- Species: V. tameamea

Binomial name
- Vanessa tameamea (Eschscholtz, 1821)

Synonyms
- Pyrameis cordelia Doubleday & Hewitson, 1847; Pyrameis tameamea Eschscholtz, 1821

= Kamehameha butterfly =

Species of butterfly

The Kamehameha butterfly (Vanessa tameamea) is one of the two species of butterfly endemic to Hawaii, the other is Udara blackburni. The Hawaiian name is pulelehua. This is today a catch-all native term for all butterflies; its origin seems to be pulelo "to float" or "to undulate in the air" + lehua, "reddish", or "rainbow colored", probably due to the predominant color of the Metrosideros polymorpha flower: an animal that floats through the air, from one lehua to another. Alternatively, it is called lepelepe-o-Hina – roughly, "Hina's fringewing" – which is today also used for the introduced monarch butterfly.

The Kamehameha butterfly was named the state insect of Hawaii in 2009, due to the work of a group of fifth-graders from Pearl Ridge Elementary. These 5th graders (Robyn-Ashley Amano, Ryan Asuka, Kristi Kimura, Jennifer Loui, Toshiro Yanai and Jenna Yanke) proposed the butterfly as the state insect to various legislators as a project for Gifted and Talented.

== Description ==
Vanessa tameamea is a medium-sized Nymphalid, featuring dark colouration with reddish orange markings. Unusual in the genus is the presence of sexual dimorphism, via a series of three small spots on the anterior forewing. These spots are typically white in females, and orange in males. Visually, this species appears intermediate between the ladies and admirals. The closest morphological relatives are Vanessa indica and V. samani.

The caterpillars feed on the leaves of plants in the family Urticaceae, especially those of māmaki (Pipturus albidus) but also ōpuhe (Urera spp.), ʻākōlea (Boehmeria grandis), olonā (Touchardia latifolia), and maʻoloa (Neraudia spp.). Adults eat the sap of koa (Acacia koa) trees.

== Behavior ==
Vanessa tameamea typically occurs in the mid to upper canopy during flights, particularly in hotter periods of the day. It may descend to the lower canopy to bask in sun, or rarely to visit nectar sources such as Rubus. Basking individuals perch on the upper surface of exposed, sunlit leaves of shrubs and trees. When dappled light or gaps in the canopy allow, partial basking may also occur during cryptic camouflage behavior, where adults rest on the bark of trees facing downwards. Short-term hibernation has been reported, taking place in tight furrows in bark, or on the underside of Acacia koa limbs. These behaviors are shared among other related species elsewhere in the world, such as the red admirals, and particularly the New Zealand red admiral. Adult Kamehameha butterflies are seen throughout all months of the year, but generally peak in spring months.

== Distribution ==
The Kamehameha butterfly occurs on all four of the major Hawaiian Islands: Oʻahu, Kauaʻi, Maui, and the Big Island, as well as on Lānaʻi. However, it is now absent from much of its former range due to decline of native forest habitat, necessary indigenous host plants, and widespread predation from non-native species. Conservation efforts such as the Hawai’i Invertebrate Program (HIP), and local projects operated by the Division of Forestry and Wildlife, continue to rear and attempt to maintain wild populations of this butterfly on O'ahu and the Big Island. Today, most sightings occur in high elevation damp forest, such as that within Hawaiʻi Volcanoes National Park, Mokulēia Forest Reserve, and Waimea Canyon State Park.

== Taxonomy ==
It is named after the royal House of Kamehameha; the last king of this lineage, Kamehameha V, died in 1872. The common name is taken from the specific name, tameamea, an old-fashioned and partially wrong transcription of "Kamehameha". The Hawaiian language has no strict distinction between the voiceless alveolar plosive and voiceless velar plosive; use varies from island to island, but today, "k" is used as the standard transliteration. The voiceless glottal transition "h" is distinct and should always be pronounced - for example, "aloha" is correct whereas "aloa" is a wrong pronunciation. Thus, while "Tamehameha" would be a legitimate transcription (though considered old-fashioned on most islands), "Tameamea" is not.
