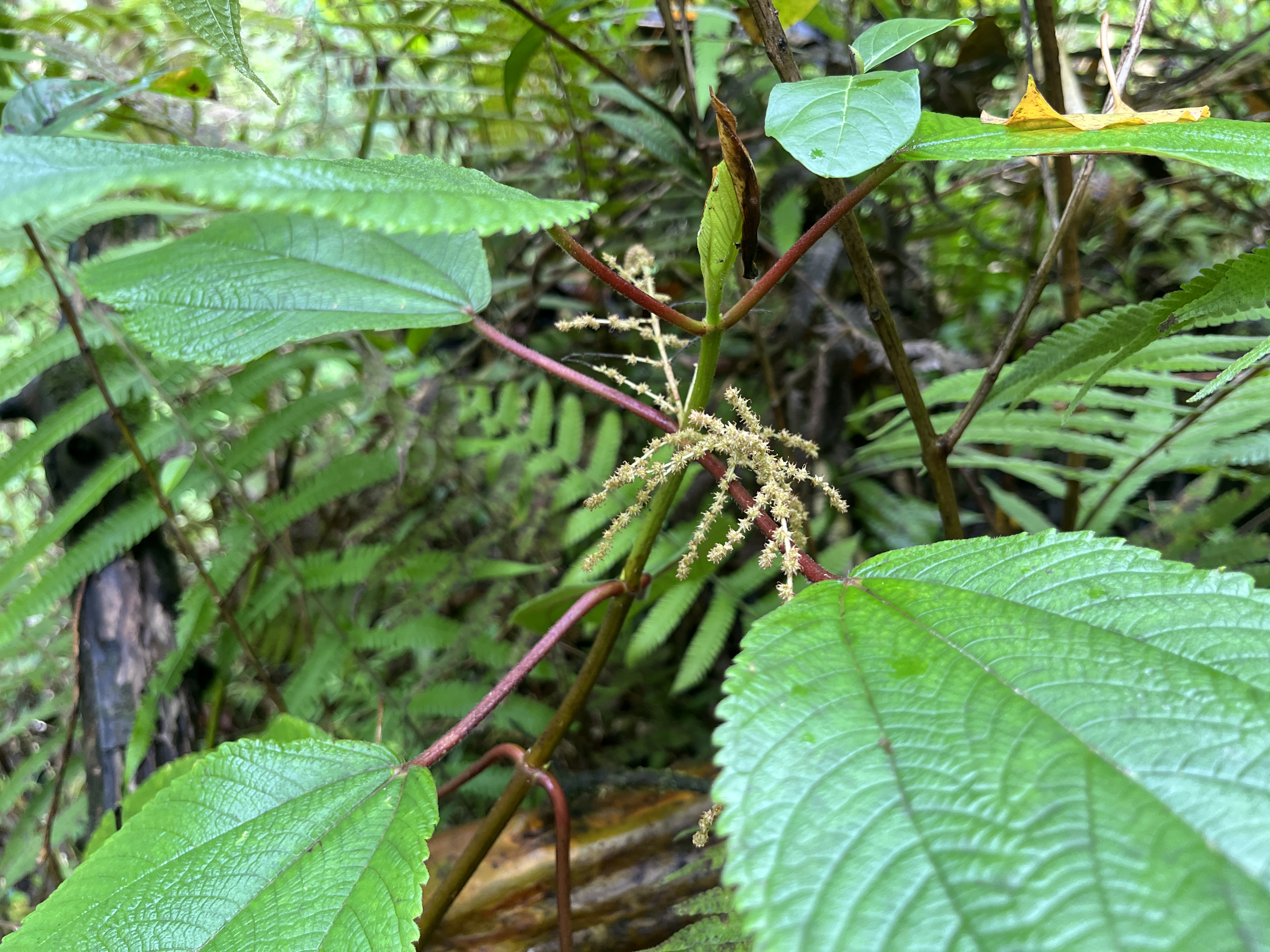

Scientific classification
- Kingdom: Plantae
- Clade: Tracheophytes
- Clade: Angiosperms
- Clade: Eudicots
- Clade: Rosids
- Order: Rosales
- Family: Urticaceae
- Genus: Boehmeria
- Species: B. grandis

Binomial name
- Boehmeria grandis (Hook. & Arn.) A.Heller

Synonyms
- Urtica grandis (Hook. & Arn.); Boehmeria amplissima (Blume); Boehmeria stipularis (Wedd); Ramium grande (Kuntze)

= Boehmeria grandis =

Species of Hawaiian plant

Boehmeria grandis, commonly called ʻakolea, is a flowering species of the Urticaceae family that is endemic to the Hawaiian Islands. ʻakolea can be found in mesic to wet forests across Hawaiʻi along streams, on ridges, and valley floors. Multiple sources have cited observations in Makaua Gulch on Oʻahu.

The ʻakolea can look like and be confused with its endemic counterpart Māmaki (Pipturus albidus) of the same family. However, differences in ʻakolea's appearance come from its exerted stamens, the tightly grouped seeds on the branches of Māmaki, and subtle differences between the leaves of both that can be difficult to notice.

== Ecosystem services ==
ʻakolea is one of the four endemic host plants for the pulelehua (Vanessa tameamea), meaning the pulelehua butterflies and caterpillars will only reproduce where these host plants are found. Other pulelehua host plants include Māmaki, Olonā (Touchardia latifolia), and Ōpuhe (Urera glabra) and (U. kaalae).

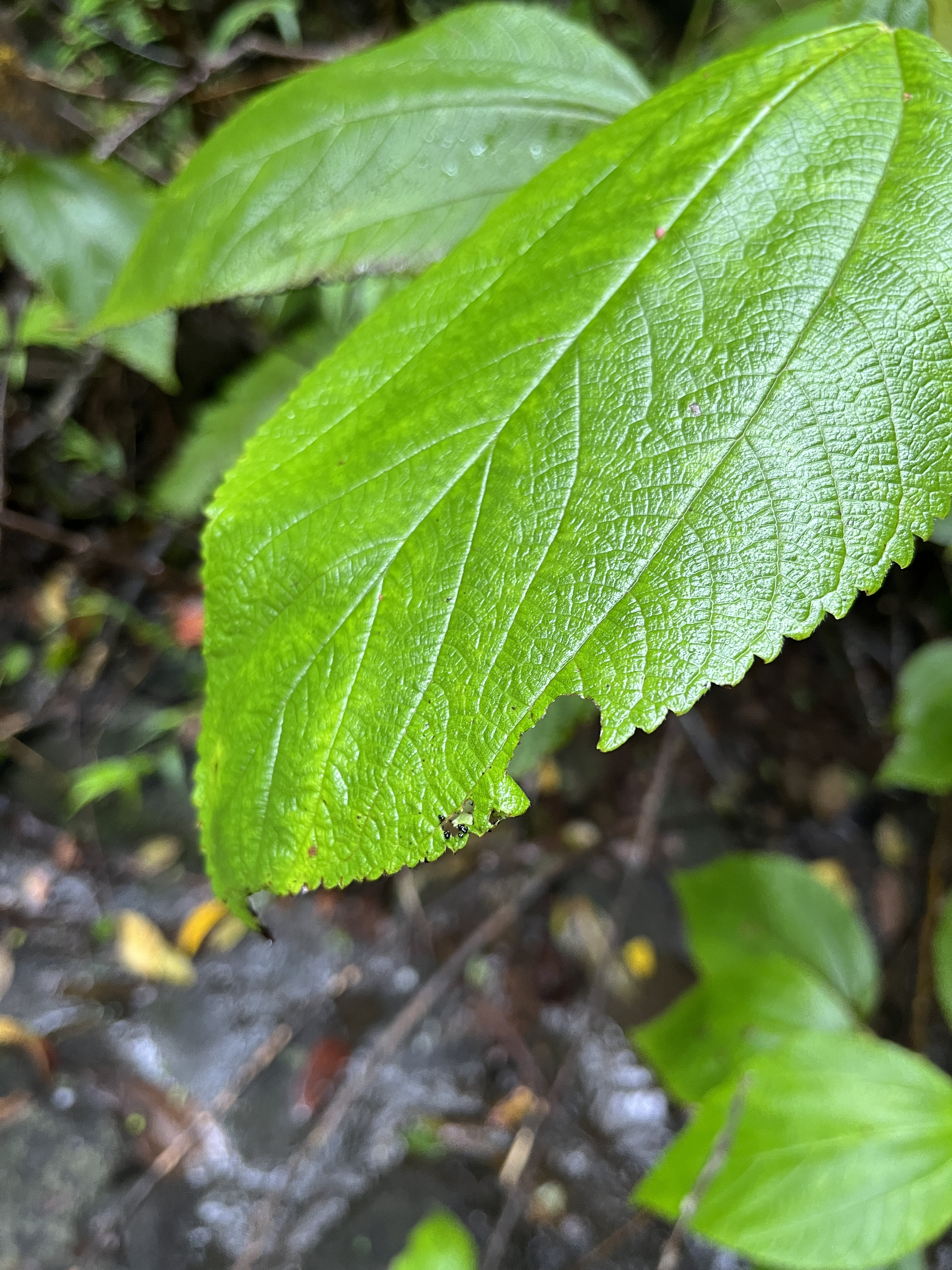
Remnants of a Kamehameha butterfly (pulelehua) hook on ʻakolea
