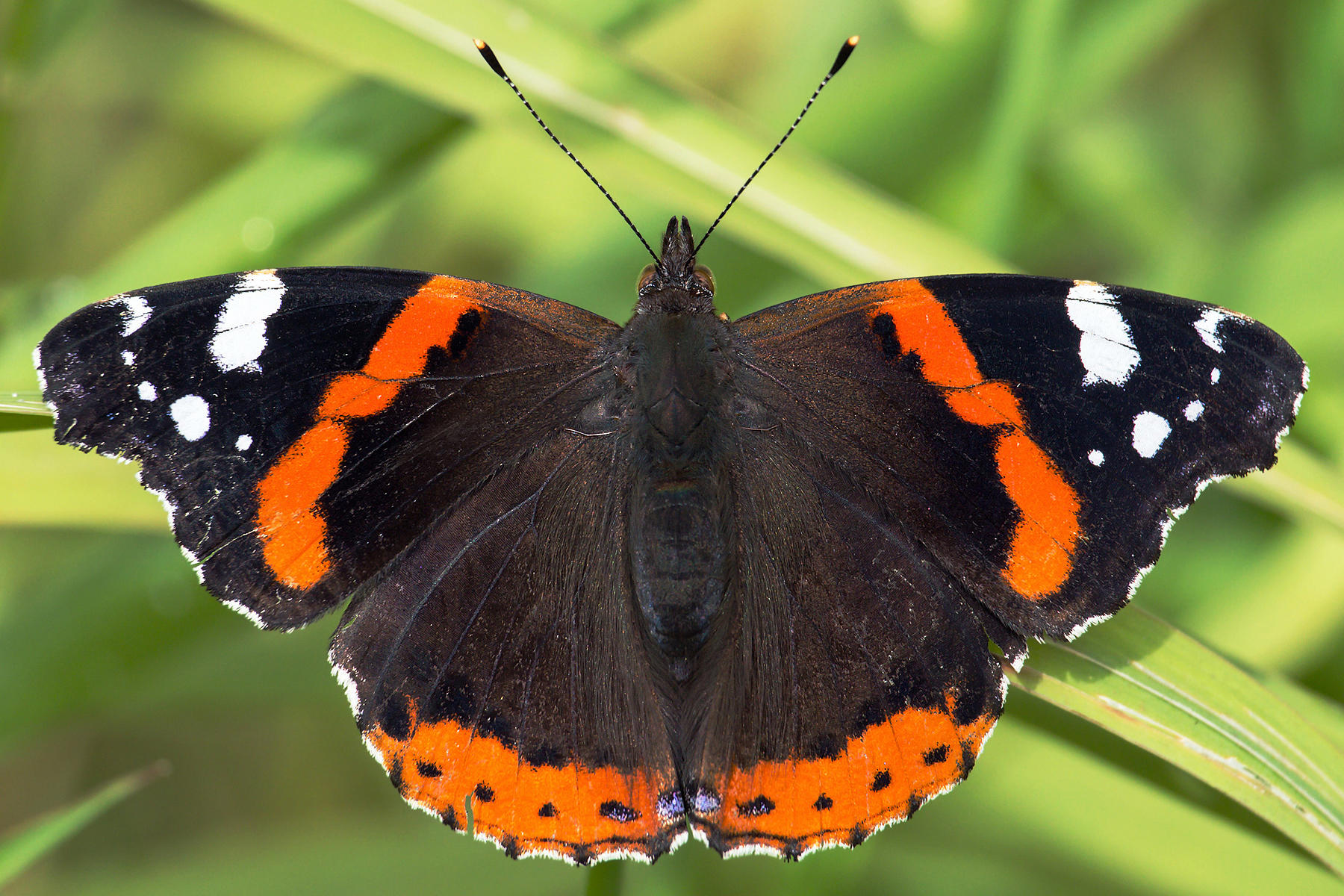
- V. a. atalanta, in Germany
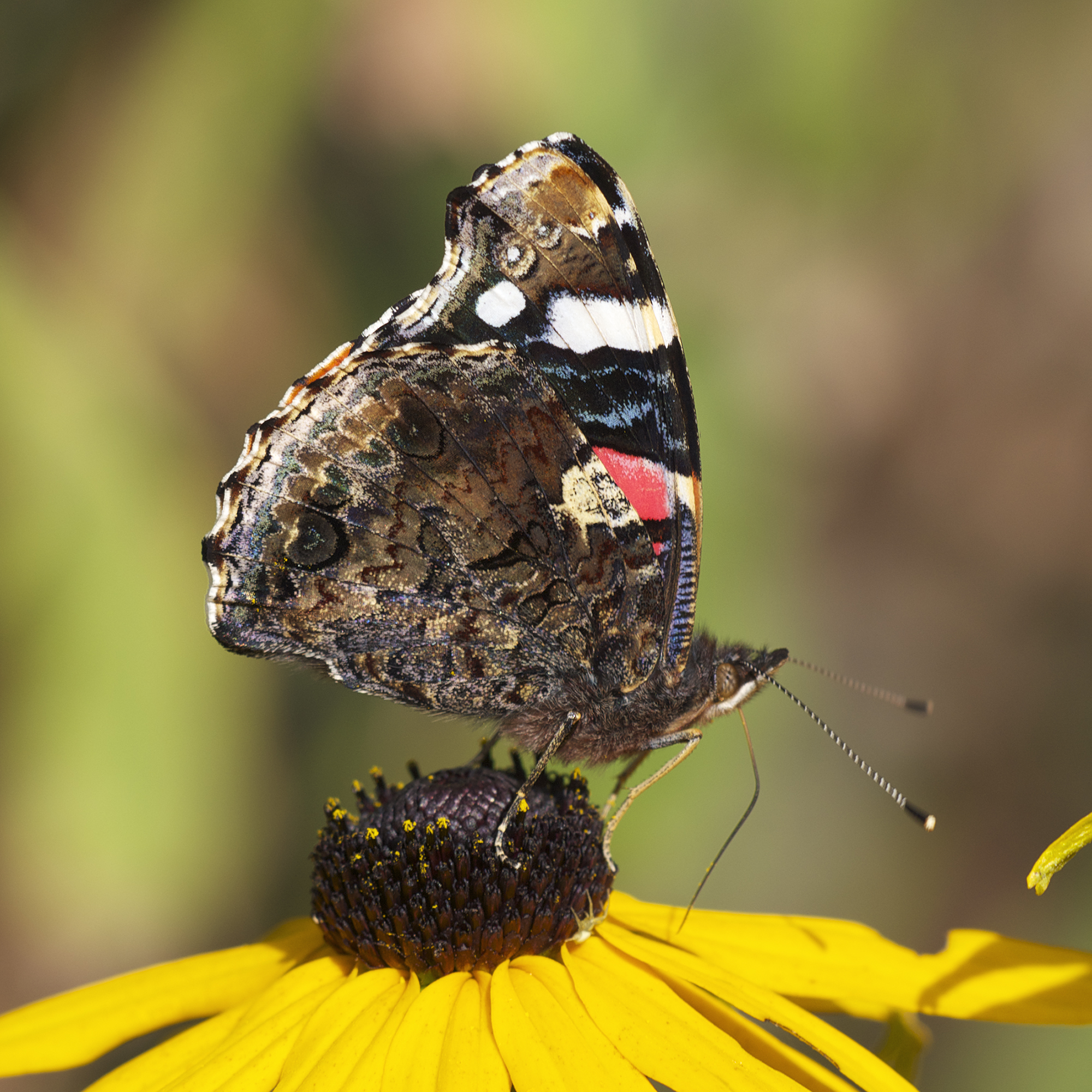
- V. a. atalanta, in Germany

Conservation status
- Least Concern (IUCN 3.1)

- Secure (NatureServe)

Scientific classification
- Kingdom: Animalia
- Phylum: Arthropoda
- Clade: Pancrustacea
- Class: Insecta
- Order: Lepidoptera
- Family: Nymphalidae
- Genus: Vanessa
- Species: V. atalanta

Binomial name
- Vanessa atalanta (Linnaeus, 1758)

Subspecies
- V. a. atalanta; V. a. rubria (Fruhstorfer, 1909)

Synonyms
- Papilio atalanta Linnaeus, 1758; Pyrameis ammiralis Godart, 1821; Pyrameis atalanta (Linnaeus, 1758)

= Vanessa atalanta =

Red admiral

Species of butterfly

Vanessa atalanta, the red admiral or, previously, the red admirable, is a well-characterized, medium-sized butterfly with black wings, red bands, and white spots. It has a wingspan of about 2 inches (5 cm). It was first described by Carl Linnaeus in his 1758 10th edition of Systema Naturae. The red admiral is widely distributed across temperate regions of North Africa, North America, Europe, Asia, and the Caribbean. It resides in warmer areas, but migrates north in spring and sometimes again in autumn. Typically found in moist woodlands, the red admiral caterpillar's primary host plant is the stinging nettle (Urtica dioica); it can also be found on the false nettle (Boehmeria cylindrica). The adult butterfly drinks from flowering plants like Buddleja and overripe fruit. Red admirals are territorial; females will only mate with males that hold territory. Males with superior flight abilities are more likely to successfully court females. It is known as an unusually calm butterfly, often allowing observation at a very close distance before flying away, also landing on and using humans as perches.

== Subspecies ==
Vanessa atalanta has 2 subspecies, which differ in geographical distribution:

Subspecies	Distribution	Dorsal	Ventral
V. a. atalanta	Old World		
V. a. rubria	New World		

== Geographic range ==
The red admiral is found in temperate regions of North Africa, North and Central America, Europe, Asia, and island regions of Hawaii, and the Caribbean.

== Description ==
The forewing of this butterfly bears on a black ground an oblique vermilion band and a group of white subapical spots. On the hindwing the larger portion of the distal margin is red, with a row of small black spots and at the anal angle an elongate blue spot. The underside is partly variegated with blue; the forewing is on the whole similar in markings to the upper, while the hindwing is brightly variegated and clouded, bearing black markings, of which those in the cell resemble a figure (on the left wing 18 or 98, on the right 81 or 89); in the middle of the costal area there is a pale patch and in the distal marginal area a row of ocellus-like spots. Sometimes, especially in the female, the red band of the forewing bears a small white spot in the middle.

== Biology ==
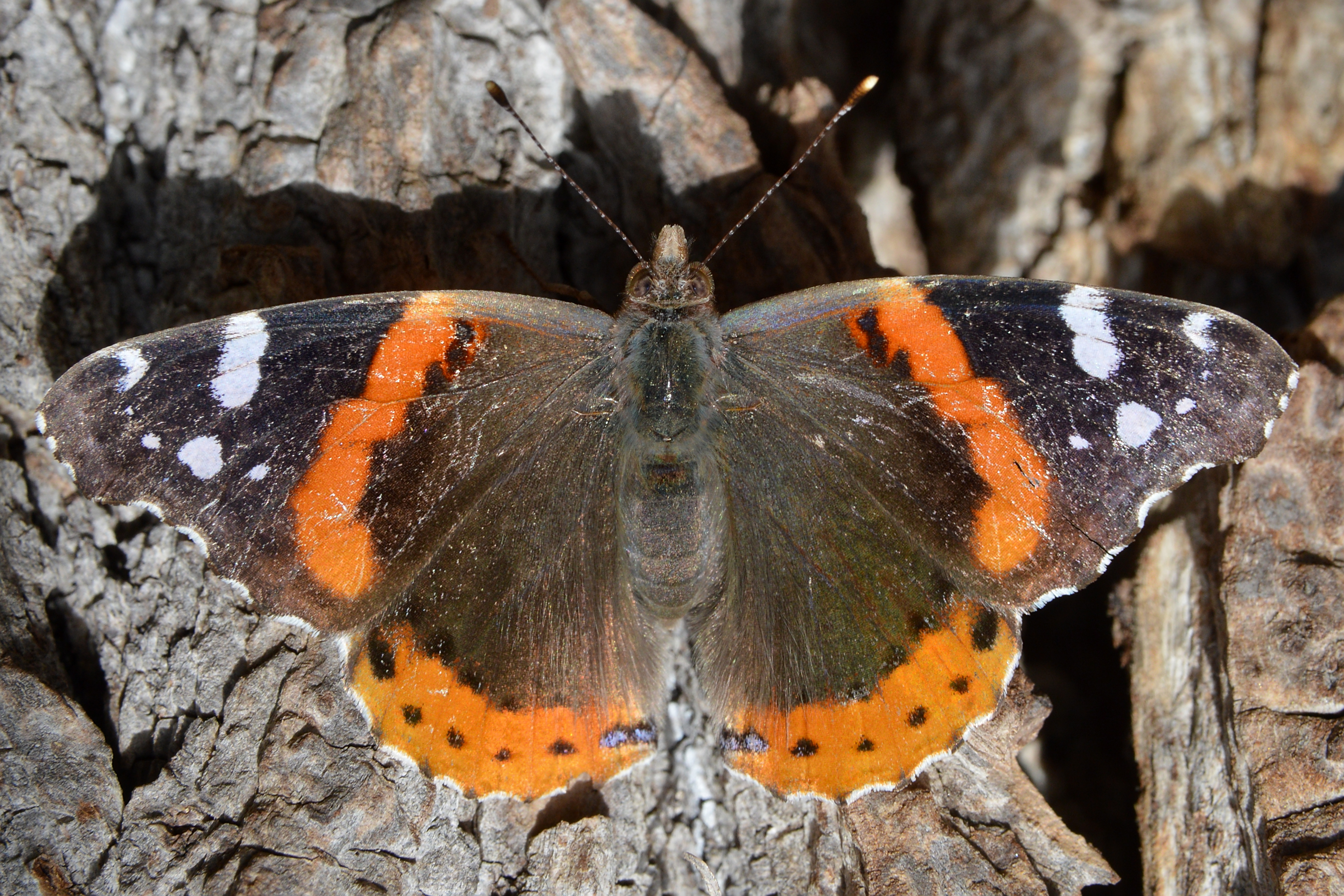
V. a. rubria in Ontario, Canada

In northern Europe, it is one of the last butterflies to be seen before winter sets in, often feeding on the flowers of ivy on sunny days. The red admiral is also known to hibernate, re-emerging individuals showing prominently darker colors than the first brood. The butterfly also flies on sunny winter days, especially in southern Europe.

In North America, the red admiral generally has two broods from March through October. Most of North America must be recolonized each spring by southern migrants, but the species overwinters in south Texas.

== Life cycle ==
=== Larval and pupal stages ===
Red admiral larvae measure approximately 1 inch (2.5 cm) in length. Their coloration is variable, but they are usually black with white spots and spines. These spines persist into the pupal phase.

In laboratory tests where larvae were reared at various constant temperatures, a difference in pupal period and coloration was found. At higher temperatures, around 32 degrees Celsius (90 °F), the pupal period of the red admiral is 6 days. At 11 to 18 degrees Celsius (51 to 64 °F) this period increases to 18 to 50 days. At even lower temperatures around 7 degrees Celsius (45 °F), the pupal period lasts between 47 and 82 days. The pupae are bright scarlet at high temperatures and black with a smaller scarlet area at low temperatures. This differential coloration at various temperatures may explain why the summer form of the red admiral is brighter and more heavily pigmented than the winter form.

The primary host plant for the red admiral is the stinging nettle (Urtica dioica), but it can also be found on the false nettle (Boehmeria cylindrica), Pennsylvania pellitory (Parietaria) and other species within Urticaceae. Certain plants of the families Compositae and Cannabaceae may also be used as hosts.

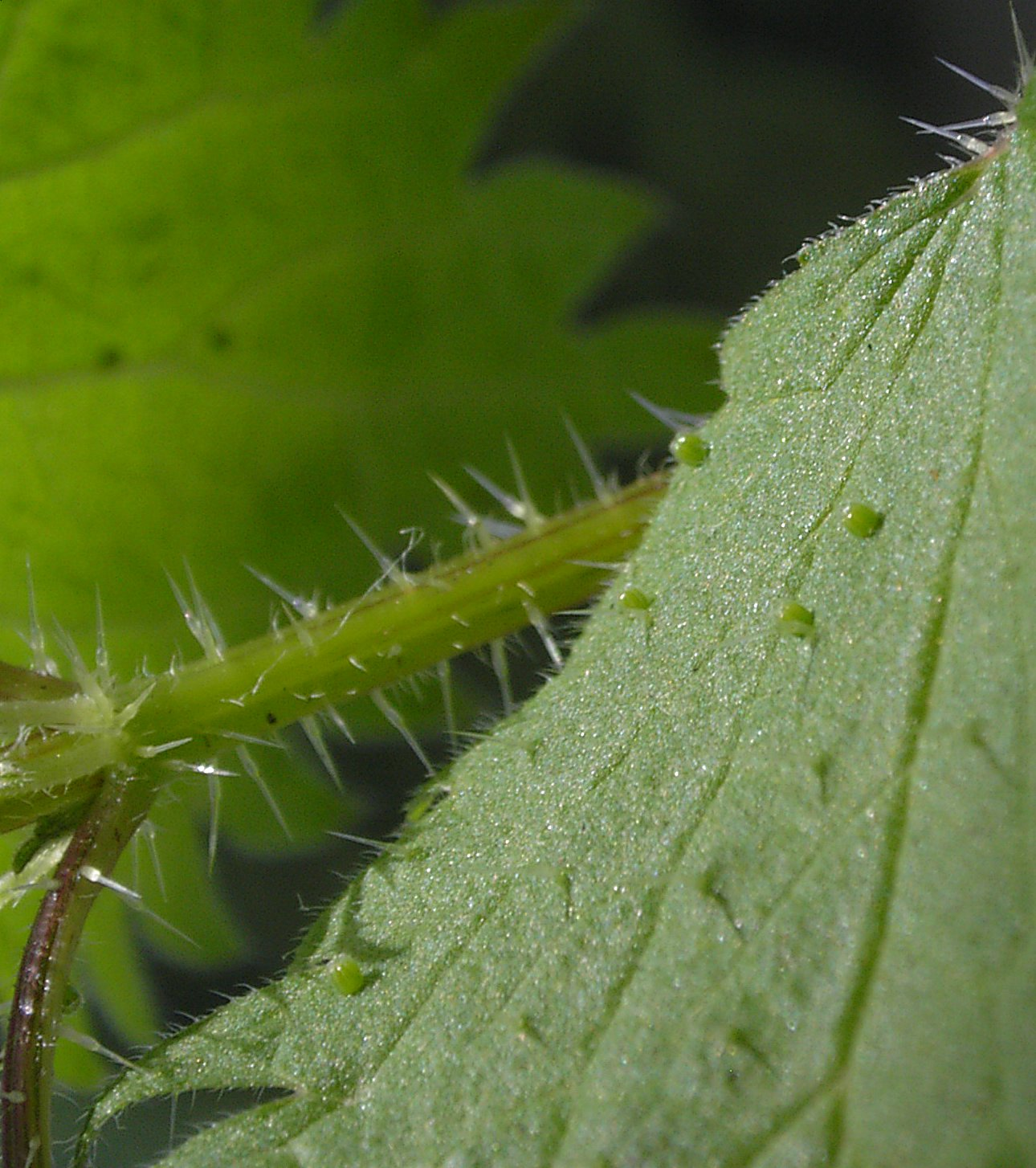
Eggs

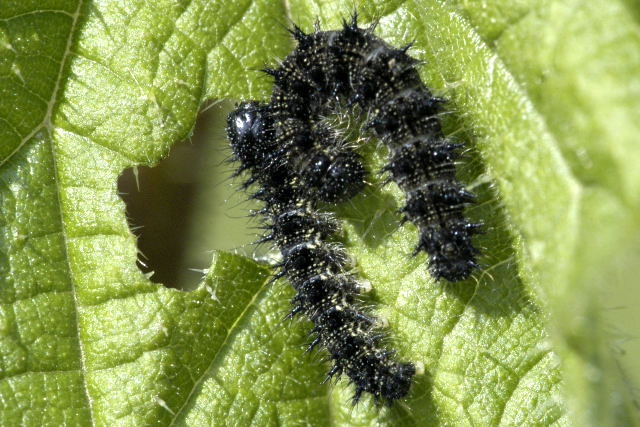
Early instar

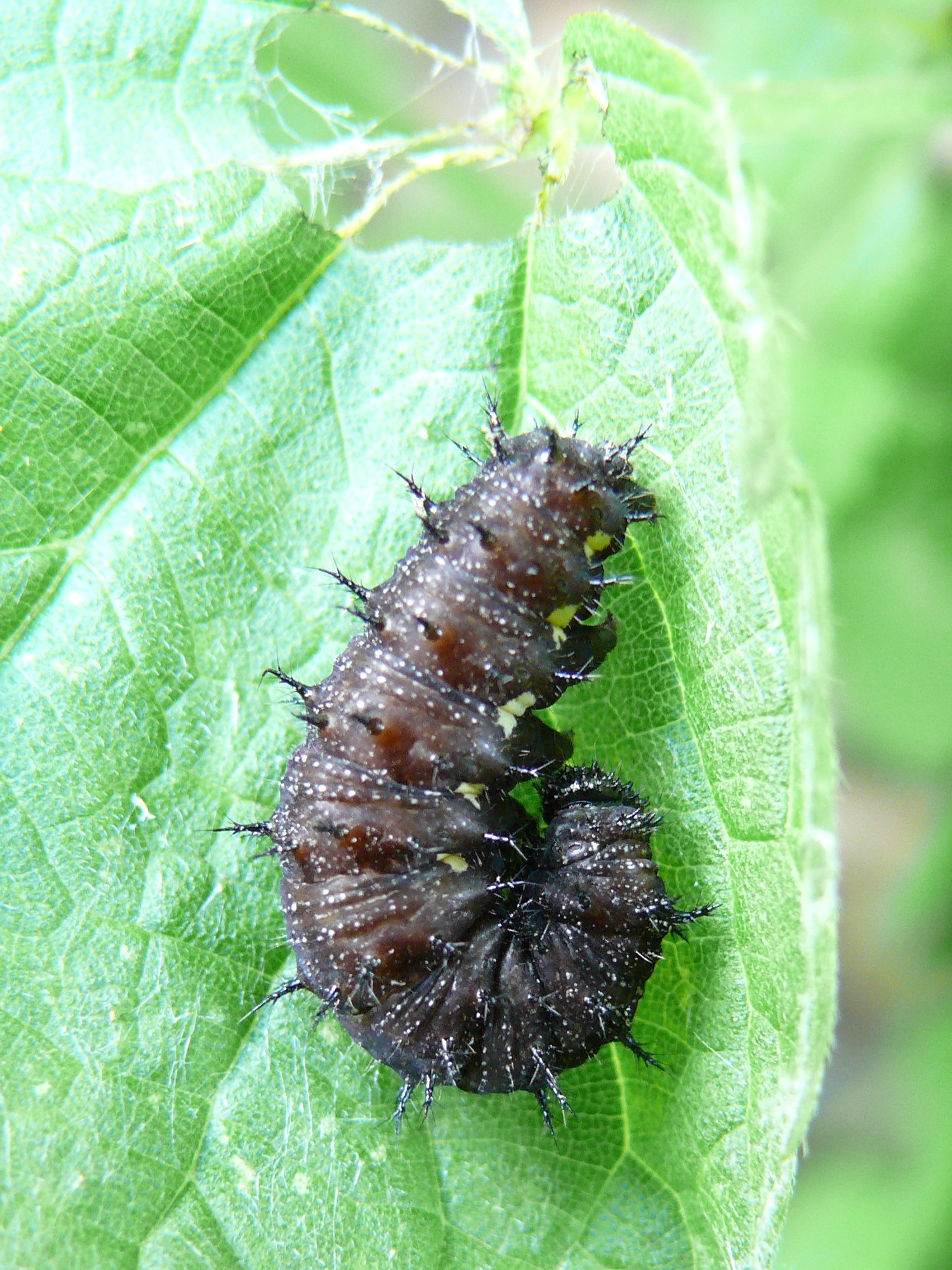
Late instar

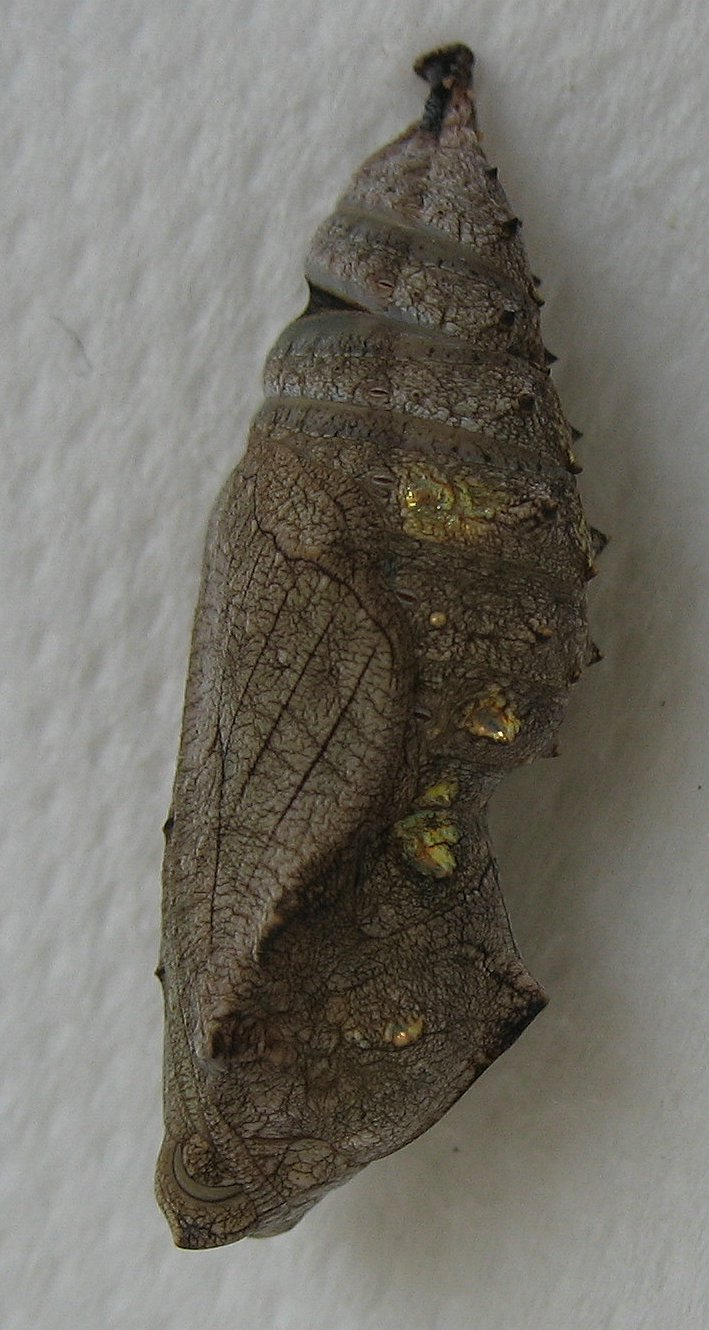
Chrysalis

=== Adult stage ===
The red admiral is identified by its striking black, orange, and white wing pattern. On the dorsal side, its dark wings possess orange bands on the middle of the forewings and the outer edge of the hindwings. The distal ends of the forewings contain white spots. The ventral side of the wings are brown with patches of red, white, and black. The hindwings have a brown marbled pattern. The red admiral has summer and winter morphs. Summer red admirals are larger and more pigmented than winter morphs. The wingspan ranges from 1.75 to 2.50 inches (4.4 to 6.4 cm).

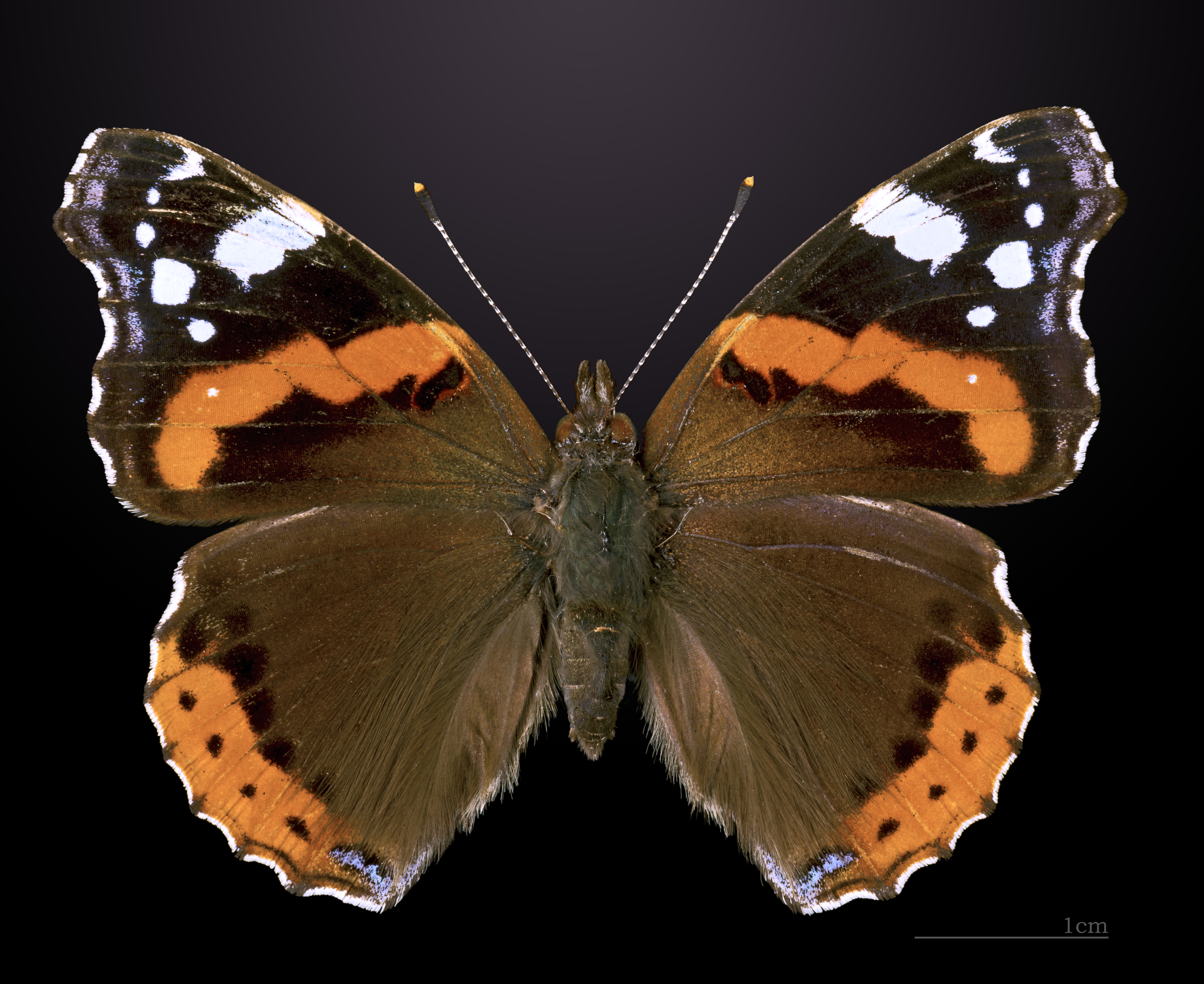
Adult V. a. atalanta from France (dorsal)

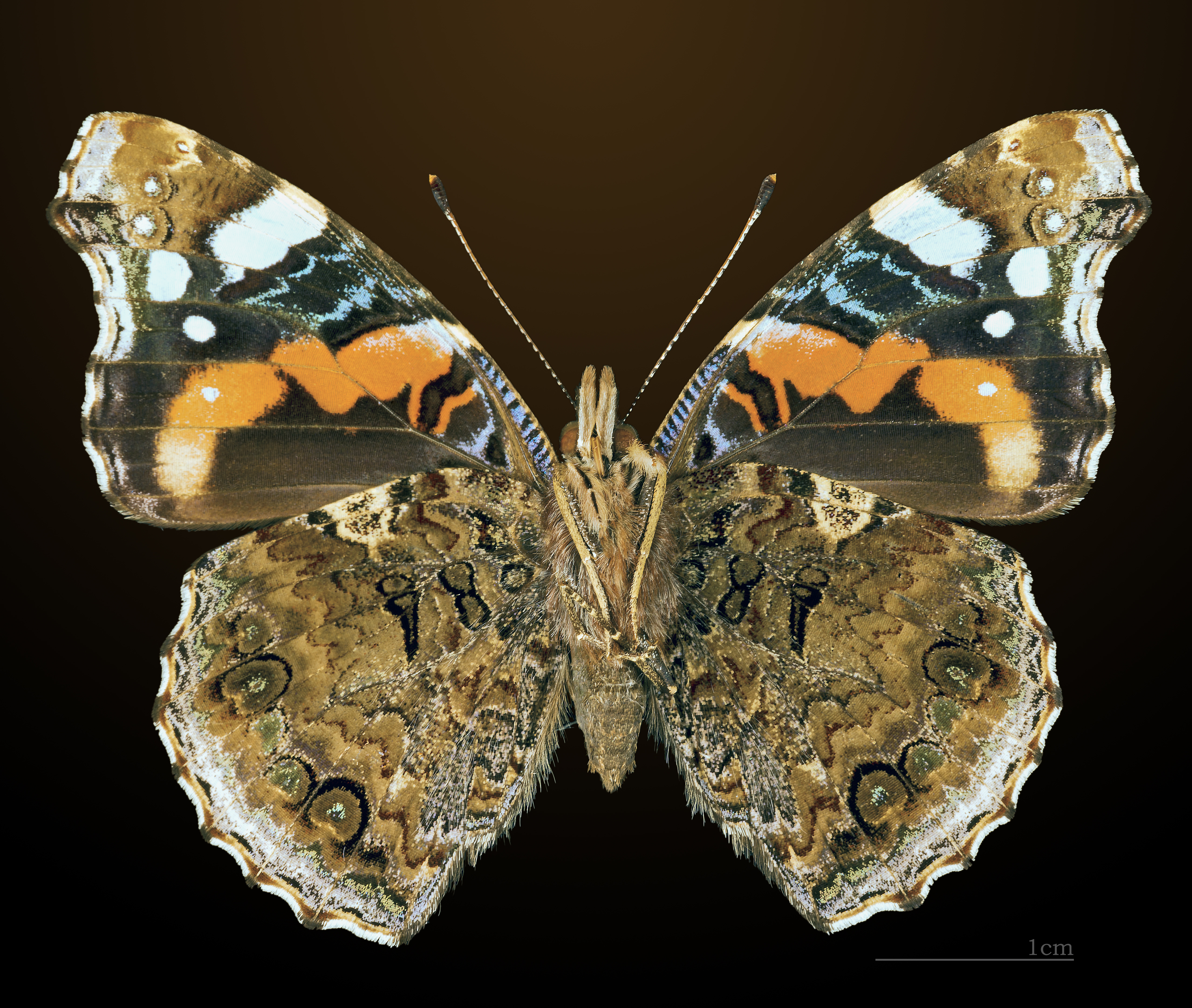
Adult V. a atalanta from France (ventral)

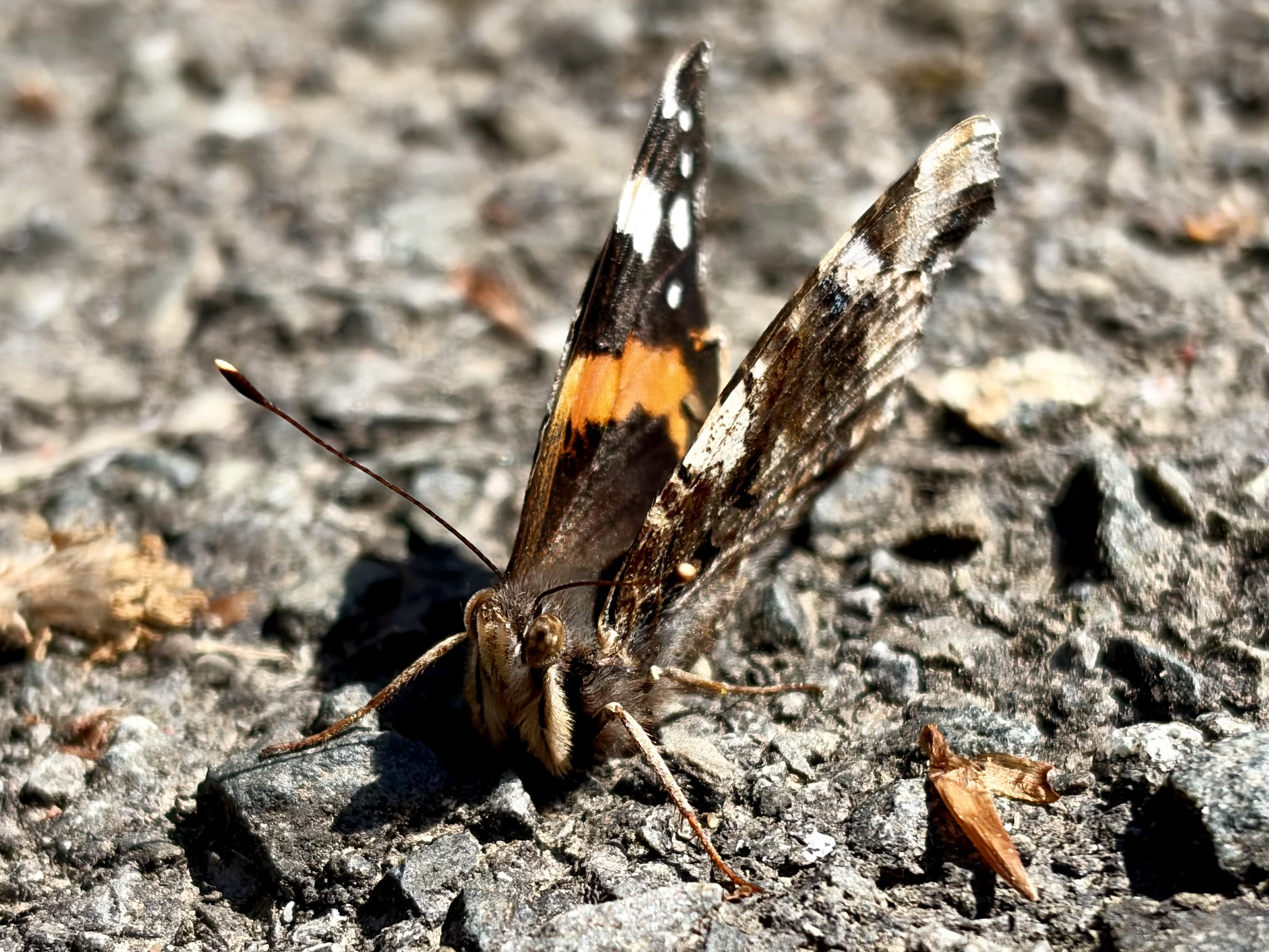
Front view of adult V. a. atalanta in Wales

== Territoriality ==
Male red admirals are territorial and perch during the afternoon until sunset. Larger territories are optimal and subject to intrusion by other males more frequently than smaller territories. Territories tend to be oval, 8–24 feet (2.4–7.3 m) long and 13–42 feet (4.0–12.8 m) wide. Males patrol their territory by flying around the perimeter between 7 and 30 times per hour. On average, territory holders interact with intruders 10 to 15 times per hour.

When another male encroaches on a red admiral's territory, the resident chases away the intruder, often in a vertical, helical path to disorient or tire out the intruder while minimizing the horizontal distance it travels from its perch. The red admiral immediately returns to its territory after chasing off encroaching males. Time spent patrolling increases as the number of the intruder interactions increases.

Patrolling behavior is correlated with warmer air temperatures, so males begin patrolling early and continue later on warmer days. Overcast skies usually led to patrolling later in the day. It is not clear whether this later start time is due to lower air temperature or a direct effect of decreased solar radiation. Another theory is that males believe it is earlier in the morning on cloudy days because of the reduced solar radiation.

== Mating ==
Male red admirals court females for several hours before they begin mating. Because of female choice, only males with territory have the opportunity to mate. Females select males with traits that will increase the mating success of their offspring. In order to maintain their territory, males fly around and patrol the area 7 to 30 times per hour. Only males of exceptional flying ability are able to chase off intruding males and successfully court females.

== Migration ==
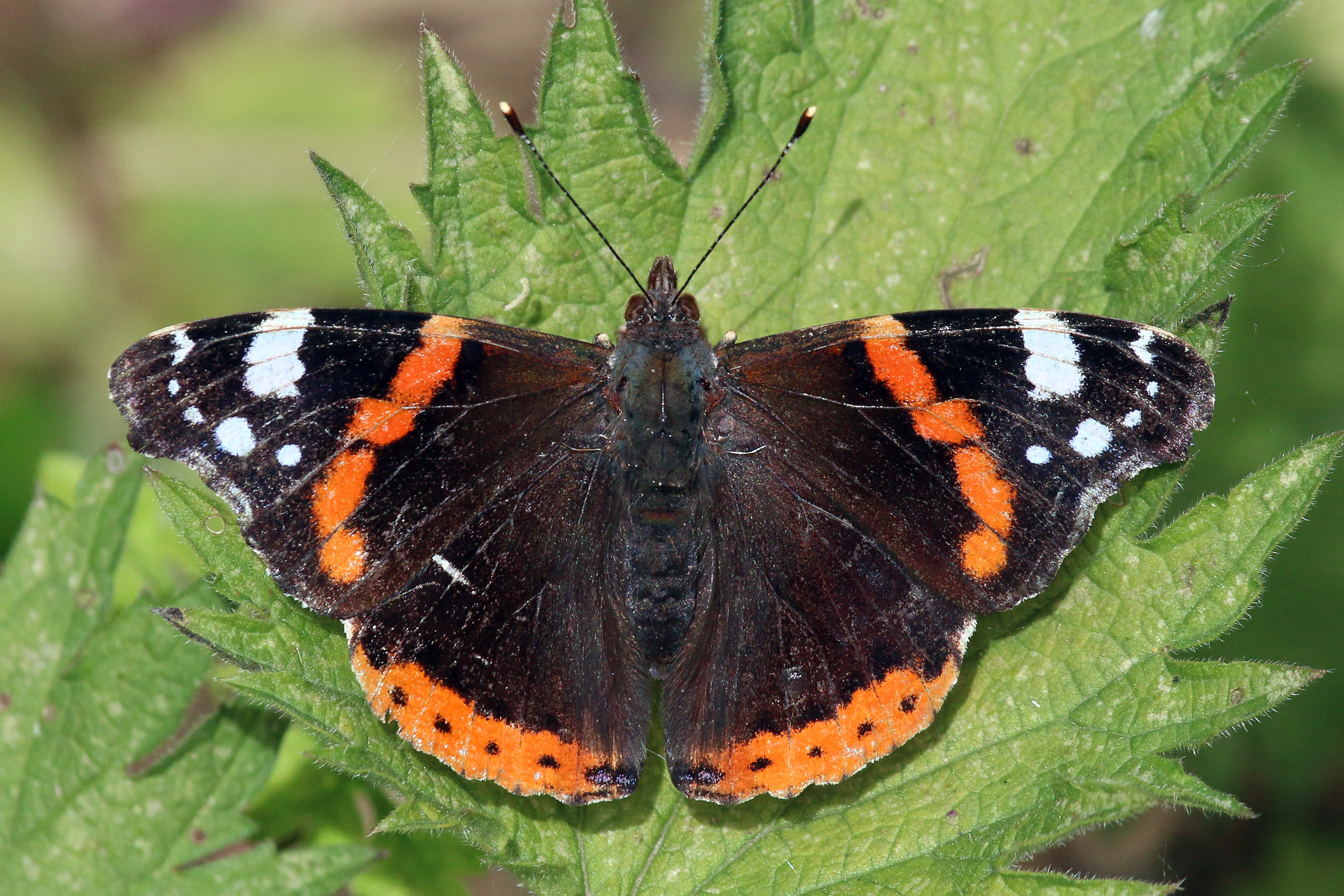
V. a. atalanta in France

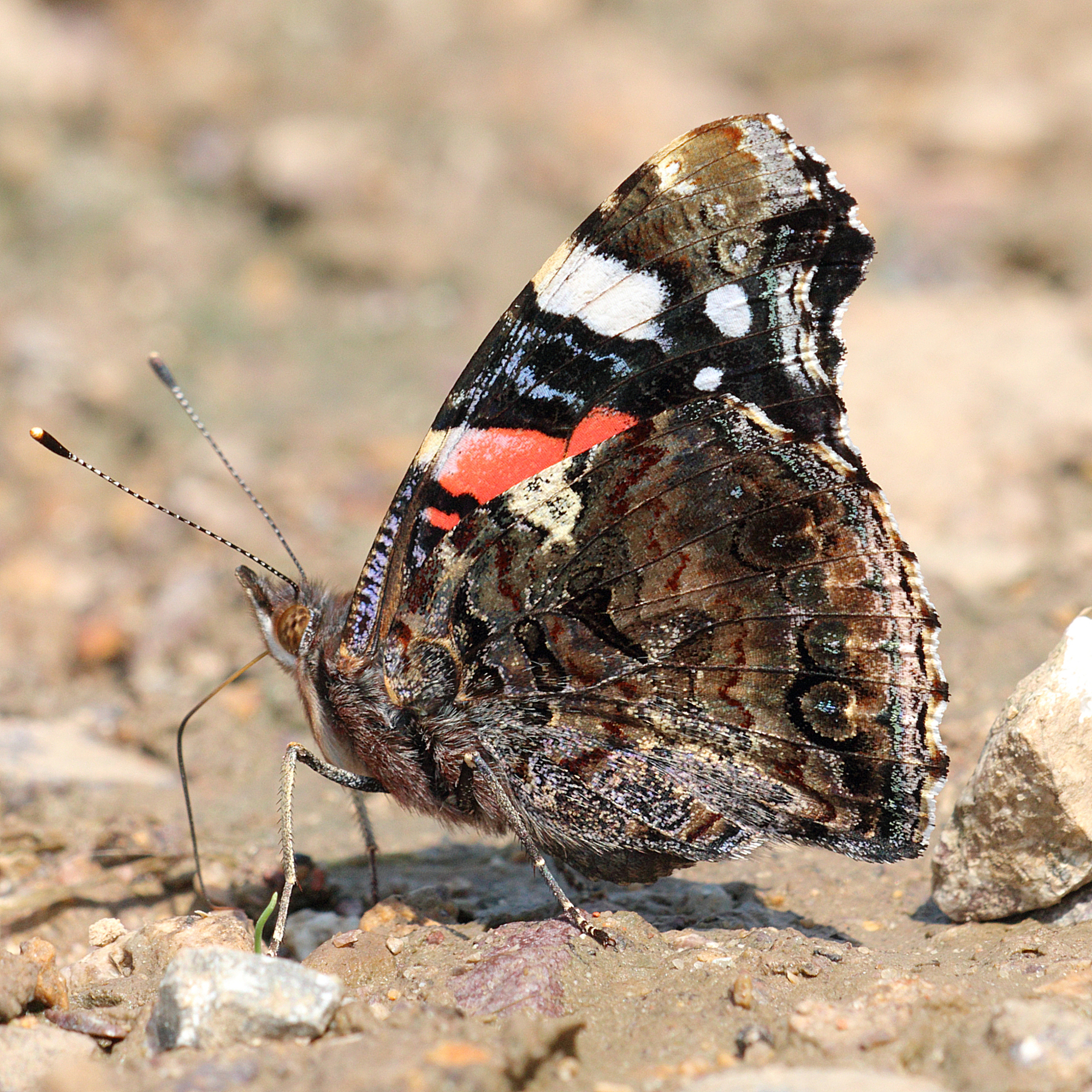
V. a. atalanta in Germany

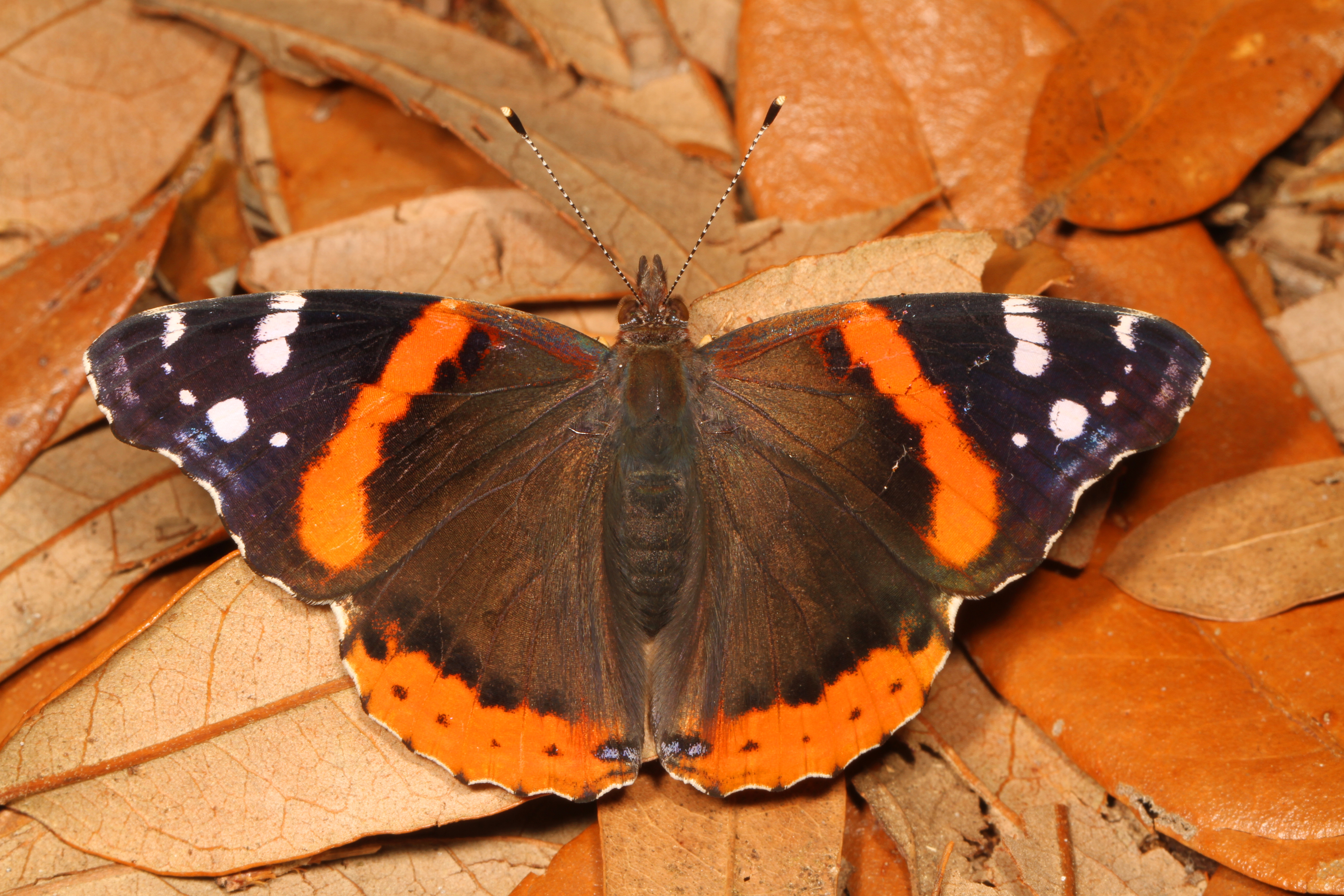
V. a. rubria in Georgia, USA

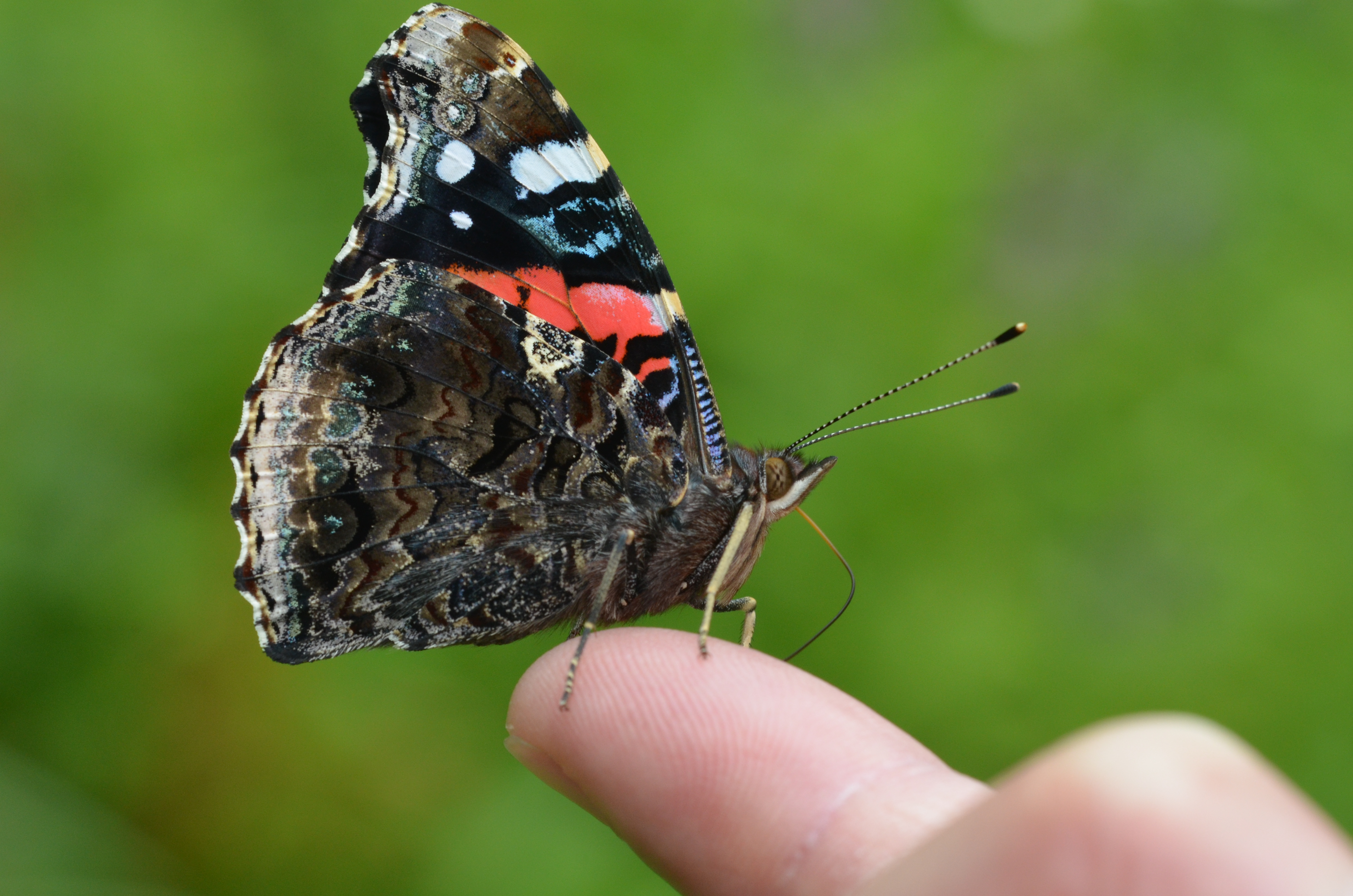
V. a. rubria in Missouri, USA

Mating usually occurs in late autumn or early winter following collective migration to southern regions with a warmer climate. The red admiral's main host plant, stinging nettle, is most abundant during this migration. Larval development proceeds through winter and adults are first sighted in early spring. The new generation of adults migrates north before mating, because food is usually diminished by late spring. In Europe, the cyclic nature of this migration has been confirmed by analysing stable isotopes of wing samples. In spring, individuals arriving at northern Europe (Kaliningrad) were of a southern origin, while in autumn the isotope analyses revealed that samples came from the surrounding area or northern latitudes. During migration, the red admiral flies at high altitudes where high-speed winds carry the butterfly, reducing energy expenditure.

== Physiology ==
=== Vision ===
Red admirals have color vision in the 440–590 nm range of the visible spectrum which includes indigo, blue, green, and yellow. They have compound eyes with a transparent, crystalline structure called a rhabdom which is similar in function to a human retina. These butterflies do not have the specific lateral filtering pigments coating their rhabdom found in some other nymphalid butterflies that likely evolved later. A consequence of this lack of pigment is that the red admiral cannot differentiate between colors in the 590–640 nm range, which includes orange and red. In species such as the monarch butterfly that express these lateral filtering pigments, higher wavelengths of light are altered, so they can excite the sensory photopigments. This physiological difference between butterfly species provides insight into the evolutionary adaptation of color vision.

== Conservation ==
=== Climate change ===
Spring temperatures in central England between 1976 and 1998 increased by 1.5 degrees Celsius and summer temperatures increased by 1 degree Celsius. Following this 22-year period of warming, the red admiral appeared six weeks earlier in the year. Of 35 species of butterflies studied in central England, the change in the duration of flight period was most significant in the red admiral, exhibiting a 39.8 day increase. These changes in migration time and length could result in an increased abundance of red admirals and a northward range expansion. Warmer climates could lead to an increase in time spent finding mates, laying eggs, and collecting nectar. Conversely, more frequent droughts associated with climate change would decrease egg survival and lead to habitat and host plant destruction.

== In popular culture ==
The red admiral features in several works of Vladimir Nabokov: Speak, Memory (1951), Pale Fire (1962), and King, Queen, Knave (1968). It also appears in 'HMS Surprise' by Patrick O'Brian (1973).

== See also ==
- Red admiral (disambiguation)
