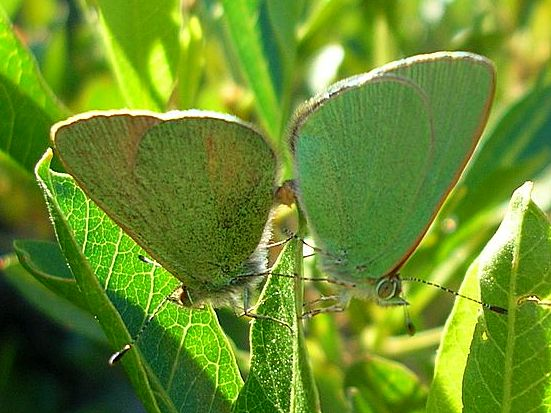
- Mating pair

Conservation status
- Least Concern (IUCN 3.1)

Scientific classification
- Kingdom: Animalia
- Phylum: Arthropoda
- Clade: Pancrustacea
- Class: Insecta
- Order: Lepidoptera
- Family: Lycaenidae
- Genus: Udara
- Species: U. blackburni

Binomial name
- Udara blackburni (Tuely, 1878)

Synonyms
- Holochila blackburni Tuely, 1878; Lycaena blackburni Meyrick, 1899; Candalides blackburni Gruenberg, 1922; Vaga blackburni Zimmerman, 1958

= Udara blackburni =

Koa butterfly

Species of butterfly

Udara blackburni, the Koa butterfly, is a butterfly in the family Lycaenidae that is endemic to Hawaiʻi. It is also known as Blackburn's butterfly, Blackburn's bluet, Hawaiian blue or green Hawaiian blue.

The wingspan is 22–29 mm.

The larvae feed on Acacia species (especially Acacia koa), Pithecellobium, Samanea saman, Perottetia sandwicensis, Dodonaea viscosa and Pipturus albidus.

Udara blackburni is one of only two butterfly species that are native to Hawai'i, the other being Vanessa tameamea. These butterflies have wings that are blue on the upper side and green on the under side.

== Description and biology ==
These butterflies have a wingspan of about an inch. The upper sides of their wings are blue and they often perch with their wings folded which reveals the under sides of the wings which are green. The adults feed on flower nectar with their long coiled up proboscis. The caterpillars are primarily found feeding on the Koa tree but occasionally on ʻaʻaliʻi, olomea, and māmaki plants.

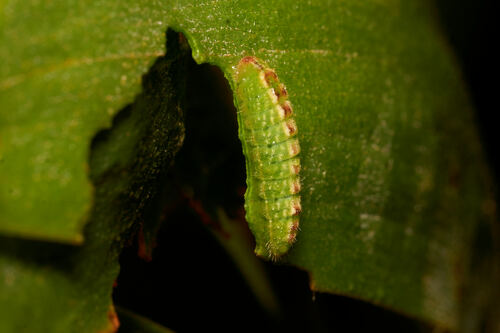
Caterpillar feeding on koa leaf

== Distribution and habitat ==
This species is endemic to Hawaiʻi and has been recorded on the islands of Kauaʻi, Oʻahu, Maui, Molakaʻi, Lanaʻi, and Hawaiʻi Island. Of the main Hawaiian Islands, the only two that have no records of these butterflies are Niʻihau and Kahoʻolawe.

== Cultural significance ==
Native insects developed a lot of cultural meaning to Polynesians in the Hawaiian Islands.
