= Red admiral =

Red admiral may refer to:

== Butterflies ==
- Vanessa atalanta, in North Africa, the Americas, Europe, Asia, and the Caribbean
- New Zealand red admiral, Vanessa gonerilla
- Vanessa indica, the Indian red admiral
- Vanessa vulcania, the Canary red admiral

== People with the nickname ==
- António Alva Rosa Coutinho (1926–2010), Portuguese admiral and participant in the Carnation Revolution
- Didier Ratsiraka (1936–2021), President of Madagascar 1975–1993 and 1997–2002

== See also ==
- Admiral of the Red, a former senior rank of the Royal Navy
