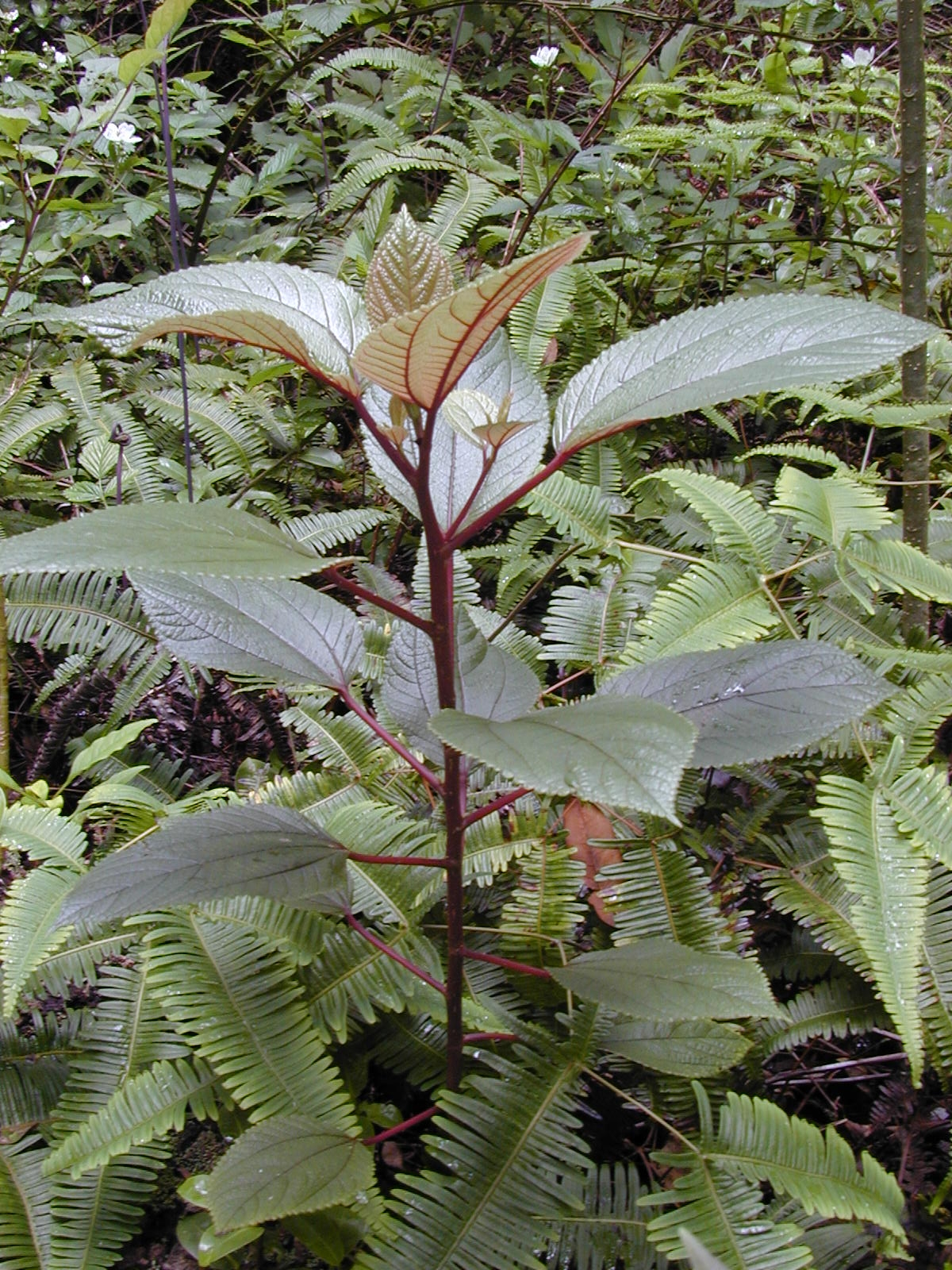

Conservation status
- Least Concern (IUCN 3.1)

- Vulnerable (NatureServe)

Scientific classification
- Kingdom: Plantae
- Clade: Tracheophytes
- Clade: Angiosperms
- Clade: Eudicots
- Clade: Rosids
- Order: Rosales
- Family: Urticaceae
- Genus: Pipturus
- Species: P. albidus

Binomial name
- Pipturus albidus (Hook. & Arn.) A.Gray ex H.Mann

= Pipturus albidus =

Māmaki

Species of plant

Pipturus albidus, known as māmaki (sometimes waimea, for its resemblance to olomea) in Hawaiian and known as Waimea pipturus in English, is a species of flowering plant in the nettle family, Urticaceae, that is endemic to Hawaiʻi. It inhabits coastal mesic, mixed mesic, and wet forests at elevations of 60–1,830 m (200–6,000 ft). Māmaki is a small tree that reaches a height of 9 m (30 ft) and a trunk diameter of 0.3 m (0.98 ft).

== Uses ==
=== Medicinal ===
Native Hawaiians made a treatment for illnesses known as ʻea and pāʻaoʻao from the fruit. They also combined fresh māmaki leaves with hot stones and spring water to produce herbal tea that was an effective treatment for general debility. Tea made from the leaves of this plant have antiviral properties, antibacterial properties, and antioxidants such as catechins, chlorogenic acid, and rutin It also contains anticancer and chemopreventive properties. Today, packages of dried māmaki leaves are commercially produced.

=== Non-medicinal ===
The bast fibres were used by Native Hawaiians to make kapa (bark cloth) and kaula (rope).

== Ecology ==
Pipturus albidus is known to attract the Kamehameha butterfly (Vanessa tameamea) and Koa butterfly (Udara blackburni) as its nectar is sweet. The Kamehameha butterfly eggs thrived on this plant in regard to both size and performance.
